

Deaths in September

12: Alexander Galimov
11: Christian Bakkerud
7: 36 players and staff of Lokomotiv Yaroslavl
5: Lee Roy Selmon

Current sporting seasons

American football 2011

National Football League
NCAA Division I FBS
NCAA Division I FCS

Australian rules football 2011

Australian Football League
Finals Series

Auto racing 2011

Formula One
Sprint Cup
Nationwide Series
Camping World Truck Series
IRL IndyCar Series
World Rally Championship
WTTC
V8 Supercar
Formula Two
GP2 Series
GP3 Series
American Le Mans
Le Mans Series
Rolex Sports Car Series
FIA GT1 World Championship
Auto GP
World Series by Renault
Deutsche Tourenwagen Masters
Super GT

Baseball 2011

Major League Baseball
Nippon Professional Baseball

Basketball 2011

WNBA
Philippines collegiate:
NCAA
UAAP

Canadian football 2011

Canadian Football League
CIS football

Cricket 2011

England:
County Championship
Clydesdale Bank 40

Football (soccer) 2011

National teams competitions
2014 FIFA World Cup qualification
UEFA Euro 2012 qualifying
2012 Africa Cup of Nations qualification
UEFA Women's Euro 2013 qualifying
International clubs competitions
UEFA (Europe) Champions League
UEFA Europa League
UEFA Women's Champions League
Copa Sudamericana
AFC (Asia) Champions League
AFC Cup
CAF (Africa) Champions League
CAF Confederation Cup
CONCACAF (North & Central America) Champions League
Domestic (national) competitions
Argentina
Brazil
England
France
Germany
Italy
Japan
Norway
Portugal
Russia
Scotland
Spain
Major League Soccer (USA & Canada)

Golf 2011

PGA Tour
European Tour
LPGA Tour
Champions Tour

Motorcycle racing 2011

Moto GP
Superbike World Championship
Supersport World Championship

Rugby league 2011

Super League
NRL

Rugby union 2011

Aviva Premiership
RaboDirect Pro12
Top 14
Currie Cup
ITM Cup

Tennis 2011

ATP World Tour
WTA Tour

Winter sports

ISU Junior Grand Prix
Snowboard World Cup

Days of the month

September 30, 2011 (Friday)

Baseball
Major League Baseball postseason:
American League Division Series:
Game 1 in Arlington, Texas: Tampa Bay Rays 9, Texas Rangers 0. Rays lead series 1–0.
Game 1 in New York: New York Yankees 1, Detroit Tigers 1 — game suspended in the bottom of the second inning due to rain; game will be resumed on October 1.

Basketball
FIBA Africa Championship for Women in Bamako, Mali:
Quarterfinals:
 50–73 
 54–85 
 77–49 
 51–72 
FIBA Americas Championship for Women in Neiva, Colombia (teams in italics qualify for World Olympic Qualifying Tournament:
Semifinals:
 61–59 
 66–53

Figure skating
ISU Junior Grand Prix:
JGP Cup of Austria in Innsbruck, Austria:
Pairs:  Sui Wenjing/Han Cong  167.14 points  Yu Xiaoyu/Jin Yang  154.37  Ekaterina Petaikina/Maxim Kurdyukov  144.47
Standings (after 3 of 4 events): Sui/Han 30 points (2 events), Yu/Jin 26 (2), Petaikina/Kurdyukov 20 (2), Tatiana Tudvaseva/Sergei Lisiev  18 (2), Britney Simpson/Matthew Blackmer  15.
Ladies:  Vanessa Lam  156.58 points  Li Zijun  156.40  Polina Agafonova  148.65
Standings (after 5 of 7 events): Polina Shelepen  30 points (2 events), Lam & Li 26 (2), Polina Korobeynikova  & Agafonova 22 (2).

Rugby league
Super League Play-offs:
Semi-Finals: Warrington Wolves 24–26 Leeds Rhinos

Rugby union
World Cup in New Zealand (team in bold qualifies for quarter-finals, team in italics qualifies for 2015 World Cup):
Pool D in Auckland:  13–5 
Standings (after 4 matches unless stated): South Africa 18 points,  10 (3), Samoa 10,  5 (3),  0.

Volleyball
Women's South American Championship in Callao, Peru (teams in bold advance to semifinals):
Pool A:  0–3 
Final standings:  6 points, Colombia 3, Uruguay 0.
Pool B:
 3–0 
 3–0 
Final standings: Brazil 9 points, Argentina 6, Chile 3, Paraguay 0.

September 29, 2011 (Thursday)

Cricket
ICC Intercontinental Cup One-Day:
6th Match in Windhoek:  266/8 (50 overs; Craig Williams 116);  247/7 (44.5/45 overs). Scotland win by 3 wickets (D/L).
Standings (after 4 matches unless stated): , Scotland 8 points,  4 (2),  4,  2,  2 (2), Namibia,  0.

Football (soccer)
UEFA Europa League group stage Matchday 2:
Group A:
Rubin Kazan  2–2  PAOK
Tottenham Hotspur  3–1  Shamrock Rovers
Standings (after 2 matches): Rubin Kazan, Tottenham Hotspur 4 points, PAOK 2, Shamrock Rovers 0.
Group B:
Vorskla Poltava  1–2  Hannover
Standard Liège  3–0  Copenhagen
Standings (after 2 matches): Standard Liège, Hannover 4 points, Copenhagen 3, Vorskla Poltava 0.
Group C:
Legia Warsaw  3–2  Hapoel Tel Aviv
Rapid București  1–3  PSV Eindhoven
Standings (after 2 matches): PSV Eindhoven 6 points, Legia Warsaw, Rapid București 3, Hapoel Tel Aviv 0.
Group D:
Vaslui  2–2  Zürich
Sporting CP  2–1  Lazio
Standings (after 2 matches): Sporting CP 6 points, Vaslui 2, Lazio, Zürich 1.
Group E:
Maccabi Tel Aviv  1–1  Dynamo Kyiv
Stoke City  2–1  Beşiktaş
Standings (after 2 matches): Stoke City 4 points, Beşiktaş 3, Dynamo Kyiv 2, Maccabi Tel Aviv 1.
Group F:
Red Bull Salzburg  3–0  Slovan Bratislava
Athletic Bilbao  2–0  Paris Saint-Germain
Standings (after 2 matches): Athletic Bilbao 6 points, Paris Saint-Germain, Red Bull Salzburg 3, Slovan Bratislava 0.
Group G:
Metalist Kharkiv  1–1  AZ
Malmö FF  1–2  Austria Wien
Standings (after 2 matches): AZ, Metalist Kharkiv 4 points, Austria Wien 3, Malmö FF 0.
Group H:
Braga  1–2  Club Brugge
Maribor  1–2  Birmingham City
Standings (after 2 matches): Club Brugge 6 points, Braga, Birmingham City 3, Maribor 0.
Group I:
Celtic  1–1  Udinese
Rennes  1–1  Atlético Madrid
Standings (after 2 matches): Atlético Madrid, Udinese 4 points, Rennes, Celtic 1.
Group J:
Schalke 04  3–1  Maccabi Haifa
AEK Larnaca  1–1  Steaua București
Standings (after 2 matches): Schalke 04 4 points, Maccabi Haifa 3, Steaua București 2, AEK Larnaca 1.
Group K:
Twente  4–1  Wisła Kraków
Odense  0–2  Fulham
Standings (after 2 matches): Twente, Fulham 4 points, Odense 3, Wisła Kraków 0.
Group L:
Lokomotiv Moscow  0–2  Anderlecht
AEK Athens  1–2  Sturm Graz
Standings (after 2 matches): Anderlecht 6 points, Lokomotiv Moscow, Sturm Graz 3, AEK Athens 0.
UEFA Women's Champions League Round of 32 first leg:
Tavagnacco  2–1  LdB Malmö
Glasgow City  1–1  Valur
Bristol Academy  1–1  Energiya Voronezh
Bobruichanka  0–4  Arsenal
CONCACAF Champions League Group Stage Matchday 5:
Group A: Alajuelense  1–0  Motagua
Standings (after 5 matches): Alajuelense 12 points,  Morelia,  Los Angeles Galaxy 9, Motagua 0.
Copa Sudamericana Round of 16 first leg:
Olimpia  0–0  Arsenal
Godoy Cruz  1–1  Universitario
Botafogo  1–1  Santa Fe

Volleyball
Women's European Championship in Italy and Serbia:
Quarterfinals in Belgrade, Serbia:
 3–0 
 0–3 
Men's Asian Championship in Tehran, Iran:
Bronze medal match:   3–1 
Final:   3–1  
Iran win the title for the first time.
Iran and China qualify for the FIVB World Cup.
Men's African Championship in Tangier, Morocco:
Bronze medal match:  1–3  
Final:   1–3  
Egypt win the title for the fourth successive time, and sixth time overall.
Egypt qualify for the FIVB World Cup.
Women's South American Championship in Callao, Peru (teams in bold advance to semifinals):
Pool A:  3–0 
Standings: Peru 6 points (2 matches), Uruguay 0 (1).
Pool B:
 3–0 
 3–0 
Standings (after 2 matches): Brazil, Argentina 6 points, Chile, Paraguay 0.

September 28, 2011 (Wednesday)

Baseball
Major League Baseball news:
The Tampa Bay Rays clinch the American League wild card with an 8–7 win over the New York Yankees.
The St. Louis Cardinals clinch the National League wild card with an 8–0 win over the Houston Astros.

Basketball
FIBA Africa Championship for Women in Bamako, Mali (teams in bold advance to the quarterfinals):
Group A:
 106–37 
 53–74 
 57–70 
Final standings: Mali 10 points, Mozambique 9, Côte d'Ivoire, DR Congo, Tunisia 7, Ghana 4.
Group B:
 49–63 
 49–59 
 59–78 
Final standings: Senegal 10 points, Angola 9, Nigeria 8, Cameroon 7, Rwanda 6, Guinea 5.
FIBA Americas Championship for Women in Neiva, Colombia (teams in bold advance to the semifinals):
Group A:
 62–42 
 45–66 
Final standings: Argentina 8 points, Cuba 7,  6, Colombia 5, Chile 4.
Group B:
 44–87 
 66–49 
Final standings:  8 points, Canada 7, Mexico, Jamaica, Paraguay 5.

Cricket
ICC Intercontinental Cup One-Day:
5th Match in Windhoek:  257 (50 overs);  137/2 (26 overs). Scotland win by 34 runs (D/L).
Standings (after 4 matches unless stated):  8 points, Scotland 6 (3),  4 (2),  4,  2,  2 (2), Namibia 0 (3),  0.

Football (soccer)
Superclásico de las Américas second leg in Belém (first leg score in parentheses):  2–0 (0–0) . Brazil win 4–1 on points.
UEFA Champions League group stage Matchday 2:
Group E:
Valencia  1–1  Chelsea
Bayer Leverkusen  2–0  Genk
Standings (after 2 matches): Chelsea 4 points, Bayer Leverkusen 3, Valencia 2, Genk 1.
Group F:
Arsenal  2–1  Olympiacos
Marseille  3–0  Borussia Dortmund
Standings (after 2 matches): Marseille 6 points, Arsenal 4, Borussia Dortmund 1, Olympiacos 0.
Group G:
Zenit St. Petersburg  3–1  Porto
Shakhtar Donetsk  1–1  APOEL
Standings (after 2 matches): APOEL 4 points, Zenit St. Petersburg, Porto 3, Shakhtar Donetsk 1.
Group H:
BATE Borisov  0–5  Barcelona
Milan  2–0  Viktoria Plzeň
Standings (after 2 matches): Barcelona, Milan 4 points, Viktoria Plzeň, BATE Borisov 1.
UEFA Women's Champions League Round of 32 first leg:
Olimpia Cluj  0–9  Lyon
Peamount United  0–2  Paris Saint-Germain
CSHVSM  2–1  Neulengbach
Apollon Limassol  2–2  Sparta Praha
PK-35 Vantaa  1–4  Rayo Vallecano
Osijek  0–4  Göteborg
YB Frauen  0–3  Fortuna Hjørring
Þór/KA  0–6  Turbine Potsdam
Twente  0–2  Rossiyanka
Stabæk  1–0  FFC Frankfurt
Copa Sudamericana Round of 16 first leg: LDU Quito  2–0  Independiente
AFC Champions League Quarter-finals second leg (first leg scores in parentheses):
Zob Ahan  1–2 (a.e.t.) (1–1)  Suwon Samsung Bluewings. Suwon Samsung Bluewings win 3–2 on aggregate.
Al-Sadd  1–2 (3–0)  Sepahan. Al-Sadd win 4–2 on aggregate.
AFC Cup Quarter-finals second leg (first leg score in parentheses): Duhok  0–3 (1–5)  Al-Wehdat. Al-Wehdat win 8–1 on aggregate.
CONCACAF Champions League Group Stage Matchday 5 (team in bold advances to the quarterfinals):
Group A: Los Angeles Galaxy  2–1  Morelia
Standings: Morelia, Los Angeles Galaxy 9 points (5 matches),  Alajuelense 9 (4),  Motagua 0 (4).
Group B:
Real España  1–1  Santos Laguna
Isidro Metapán  1–3  Colorado Rapids
Standings (after 5 matches): Santos Laguna 10 points, Colorado Rapids 7, Isidro Metapán 6, Real España 5.
Group C: Tauro  5–3  FC Dallas
Standings (after 5 matches):  UNAM 8 points, FC Dallas,  Toronto FC 7, Tauro 5.

Rugby union
World Cup in New Zealand (teams in italics qualify for 2015 World Cup):
Pool B in Palmerston North:  25–9 
Standings (after 3 matches unless stated):  14 points,  10, Georgia 4, Romania 0 (4).

Volleyball
Women's European Championship in Italy and Serbia:
Qualification playoff in Belgrade, Serbia:
 3–1 
 3–0 
Quarterfinals in Monza, Italy:
 0–3 
 3–1 
Men's Asian Championship in Tehran, Iran:
Semifinals:
 2–3 
 3–1 
Women's South American Championship in Callao, Peru:
Pool A:  1–3 
Pool B:
 3–0 
 0–3

September 27, 2011 (Tuesday)

Basketball
FIBA Africa Championship for Women in Bamako, Mali (teams in bold advance to the quarterfinals):
Group A:
 101–23 
 73–43 
 55–48 
Standings (after 4 games): Mali 8 points, Mozambique 7, Tunisia, DR Congo 6, Côte d'Ivoire 5, Ghana 3.
Group B:
 28–76 
 71–61 
 67–60 
Standings (after 4 games): Senegal 8 points, Angola 7, Nigeria, Cameroon 6, Rwanda 5, Guinea 4.
FIBA Americas Championship for Women in Neiva, Colombia (teams in bold advance to the semifinals):
Group A:
 49–64 
 65–59 
Standings (after 3 games unless stated): Argentina 6 points, Puerto Rico 6 (4), Cuba 5,  4, Chile 3.
Group B:
 69–71 
 61–88 
Standings (after 3 games unless stated): Brazil 8 points (4 games),  5, Paraguay, Jamaica 4, Mexico 3.

Football (soccer)
UEFA Champions League group stage Matchday 2:
Group A:
Bayern Munich  2–0  Manchester City
Napoli  2–0  Villarreal
Standings (after 2 matches): Bayern Munich 6 points, Napoli 4, Manchester City 1, Villarreal 0.
Group B:
CSKA Moscow  2–3  Internazionale
Trabzonspor  1–1  Lille
Standings (after 2 matches): Trabzonspor 4 points, Internazionale 3, Lille 2, CSKA Moscow 1.
Group C:
Manchester United  3–3  Basel
Oțelul Galați  0–1  Benfica
Standings (after 2 matches): Basel, Benfica 4 points, Manchester United 2, Oțelul Galați 0.
Group D:
Lyon  2–0  Dinamo Zagreb
Real Madrid  3–0  Ajax
Standings (after 2 matches): Real Madrid 6 points, Lyon 4, Ajax 1, Dinamo Zagreb 0.
UEFA Women's Champions League Round of 32 first leg:
Standard Liège  0–2  Brøndby IF
ASA Tel Aviv University  0–2  Torres
AFC Champions League Quarter-finals second leg (first leg scores in parentheses):
Jeonbuk Hyundai Motors  6–1 (3–4)  Cerezo Osaka. Jeonbuk Hyundai Motors win 9–5 on aggregate.
FC Seoul  1–0 (1–3)  Al-Ittihad. Al-Ittihad win 3–2 on aggregate.
AFC Cup Quarter-finals second leg (first leg scores in parentheses):
Muangthong United  0–0 (0–1)  Al-Kuwait. Al-Kuwait win 1–0 on aggregate.
Nasaf Qarshi  0–1 (1–0)  Chonburi. 1–1 on aggregate; Nasaf Qarshi win 4–3 on penalties.
Arbil  1–0 (2–1)  Persipura Jayapura. Arbil win 3–1 on aggregate.
CONCACAF Champions League Group Stage Matchday 5 (teams in bold advance to the quarterfinals):
Group C: Toronto FC  1–1  UNAM
Standings: UNAM 8 points (5 matches),  FC Dallas 7 (4), Toronto FC 7 (5),  Tauro 2 (4).
Group D:
Comunicaciones  2–2  Seattle Sounders
Monterrey  1–0  Herediano
Standings (after 5 matches): Seattle Sounders 10 points, Monterrey 9, Comunicaciones 7, Herediano 3.

Rugby union
World Cup in New Zealand (team in bold advances to the quarterfinals, teams in italics qualify for 2015 World Cup):
Pool A in Napier:  23–23 
Standings (after 3 matches unless stated):  15 points,  10, Canada 6,  5, Japan 2 (4).
Pool C in Nelson:  27–10 
Standings (after 3 matches unless stated):  13 points, Italy 10, United States 4 (4),  1.

Volleyball
Women's European Championship in Italy and Serbia:
Qualification playoff in Monza, Italy:
 3–0 
 3–1 
Men's African Championship in Tangier, Morocco:
Semifinals:
 3–2 
 3–0 
Men's Asian Championship in Tehran, Iran:
Quarterfinals:
 3–1 
 0–3 
 3–2 
 3–0

September 26, 2011 (Monday)

Basketball
FIBA Africa Championship for Women in Bamako, Mali (teams in bold advance to the quarterfinals):
Group A:  37–89 
Standings (after 3 games): ,  6 points, DR Congo 5,  4,  3, Ghana 2.
Group B:  66–45 
Standings (after 3 games):  6 points, Angola 5, Cameroon 4,  3.
FIBA Americas Championship for Women in Neiva, Colombia (teams in bold advance to the semifinals):
Group A:
 61–66 
 75–65 
Standings (after 2 games unless stated): Argentina, Cuba 4 points, Puerto Rico, Colombia 4 (3),  2.
Group B:
 26–77 
 73–50 
Standings (after 2 games unless stated): Brazil 6 points (3 games), Canada 5 (3), Jamaica 3, Paraguay 2.

Cricket
ICC Intercontinental Cup in Windhoek, day 4:  350 & 296/5d (87 overs);  263 & 218/4 (74 overs). Match drawn.
Standings (after 2 matches unless stated):  40 points,  20 (1), Scotland 20,  17,  16,  14 (1), Namibia 7,  0.

Rugby union
World Cup in New Zealand (team in bold qualifies for 2015 World Cup):
Pool D in New Plymouth:  81–7 
Standings (after 3 matches unless stated):  14 points, Wales,  10,  5, Namibia 0 (4).

Volleyball
Women's European Championship in Italy and Serbia (teams in bold advance to the quarterfinals, teams in italics advance to the playoffs):
Pool A in Belgrade, Serbia:
 0–3 
 1–3 
Final standings: Germany 9 points, Serbia 6, France 3, Ukraine 0.
Pool C in Zrenjanin, Serbia:
 3–0 
 3–0 
Final standings: Poland 9 points, Czech Republic 6, Romania 3, Israel 0.
Men's Asian Championship in Tehran, Iran:
Pool E:
 3–2 
 3–0 
Final standings: Iran 9 points, India 5, Japan, Pakistan 2.
Pool F:
 0–3 
 1–3 
Final standings: Australia 8 points, South Korea 6, China 4, Sri Lanka 0.

September 25, 2011 (Sunday)

Athletics
World Marathon Majors:
Berlin Marathon (KEN unless stated):
Men:  Patrick Makau Musyoki 2:03:38 (WR)  Stephen Chemlany 2:07:55  Emannuel Kimaiyo 2:09:50
Makau breaks the previous world record by 21 seconds.
Women:  Florence Kiplagat 2:19:44  Irina Mikitenko  2:22:18  Paula Radcliffe  2:23:46

Auto racing
Formula One:
 in Marina Bay, Singapore: (1) Sebastian Vettel  (Red Bull-Renault) (2) Jenson Button  (McLaren-Mercedes) (3) Mark Webber  (Red Bull-Renault)
Drivers' championship standings (after 14 of 19 races): (1) Vettel 309 points (2) Button 185 (3) Fernando Alonso  (Ferrari) 184
Sprint Cup Series – Chase for the Sprint Cup:
Sylvania 300 in Loudon, New Hampshire: (1)  Tony Stewart (Chevrolet; Stewart Haas Racing) (2)  Brad Keselowski (Dodge; Penske Racing) (3)  Greg Biffle (Ford; Roush Fenway Racing)
Drivers' championship standings (after 28 of 36 races): (1) Stewart 2094 points (2)  Kevin Harvick (Chevrolet; Richard Childress Racing) 2087 (3) Keselowski 2083

Badminton
BWF Super Series:
Japan Super Series in Tokyo (CHN unless stated):
Men's singles: Chen Long def. Lee Chong Wei  21–8, 10–21, 21–19
Women's singles: Wang Yihan def. Juliane Schenk  21–16, 21–14
Men's doubles: Cai Yun/Fu Haifeng def. Mohammad Ahsan /Bona Septano  21–13, 23–21
Women's doubles: Bao Yixin/Zhong Qianxin def. Cheng Wen-hsing /Chien Yu-chin  13–21, 25–23, 21–12
Mixed doubles: Chen Hung-ling /Cheng Wen-hsing  def. Joachim Fischer Nielsen /Christinna Pedersen  21–19, 16–21, 21–15

Basketball
FIBA Asia Championship in Wuhan, China:
Bronze medal game:  68–70 
Final:   70–69  
China win the title for the 15th time, and qualify for the 2012 Olympics.
Jordan and Korea both qualify for World Olympic Qualifying Tournament.
FIBA Africa Championship for Women in Bamako, Mali:
Group A:
 69–53 
 95–30 
 54–59 
Standings (after 3 games unless stated): Mali, Mozambique 6 points, Tunisia 4, DR Congo 3 (2), Côte d'Ivoire 3, Ghana 1 (2).
Group B:
 68–60 
 99–32 
 67–59 
Standings (after 3 games unless stated): Senegal 6 points, Nigeria 5, Rwanda 4, Cameroon, Angola 3 (2), Guinea 3.
FIBA Americas Championship for Women in Neiva, Colombia:
Group A:
 80–50 
 46–68 
Standings (after 2 games unless stated): Puerto Rico, Colombia 3 points, Argentina,  2 (1), Chile 2.
Group B:
 69–64 
 39–56 
Standings (after 2 games unless stated): Brazil 4 points, Canada 3, Jamaica 2 (1), Mexico 2,  1 (1).

Cricket
West Indies in England:
2nd T20I in London:  113/5 (20 overs);  88 (16.4 overs). West Indies win by 25 runs; 2-match series drawn 1–1.
ICC Intercontinental Cup in Windhoek, day 3:  350 & 260/4 (81 overs; Preston Mommsen 102);  263 (86.1 overs; Majid Haq 6/32). Scotland lead by 347 runs with 6 wickets remaining.

Cycling
Road World Championships in Copenhagen, Denmark:
Road race Elite Men:  Mark Cavendish  5:40:27  Matthew Goss  s.t.  André Greipel  s.t.
Cavendish becomes the first British man to win the world road race title since Tom Simpson in 1965.

Equestrianism
Show jumping – Nations Cup Promotional League:
Final in Barcelona (CSIO 5*):   (Malin Baryard-Johnsson, Angelica Augustsson, Svante Johansson, Rolf-Göran Bengtsson)   (Rutherford Latham, Antonio Marinas Soto, Julio Arias Cueva, Sergio Alvarez Moya)   (Cassio Rivetti, Oleksandr Onishchenko, Björn Nagel, Katharina Offel)
Sweden are promoted to the 2012 FEI Nations Cup.

Golf
Solheim Cup in Dunshaughlin, County Meath, Ireland, day 3: Europe  15–13  United States
Singles:
Catriona Matthew  def. Paula Creamer  6 and 5
Sophie Gustafson  def. Stacy Lewis  2 up
Morgan Pressel  def. Anna Nordqvist  2 and 1
Juli Inkster  vs. Laura Davies  halved
Vicky Hurst  def. Melissa Reid  2 up
Christel Boeljon  def. Brittany Lincicome  2 up
Brittany Lang  def. Sandra Gal  6 and 5
Christina Kim  def. Maria Hjorth  4 and 2
Suzann Pettersen  def. Michelle Wie  1 up
Ryann O'Toole  vs. Caroline Hedwall  halved
Azahara Muñoz  def. Angela Stanford  1 up
Karen Stupples  def. Cristie Kerr  10 and 8 (Kerr WD at start of match)
Europe wins the Cup for the first time since 2003 and fourth time overall.
PGA Tour:
FedEx Cup Playoffs: The Tour Championship in Atlanta (USA unless stated):
Winner: Bill Haas 272 (−8)PO
Haas defeats Hunter Mahan on the third playoff hole to win his third PGA Tour title.
Final FedEx Cup standings: (1) Haas 2760 points (2) Webb Simpson 2745 (3) Luke Donald  2567
European Tour:
Austrian Golf Open in Atzenbrugg, Austria:
Winner: Kenneth Ferrie  276 (−12)PO
Ferrie defeats Simon Wakefield  on the first playoff hole to win his third European Tour title, and first in six years.

Gymnastics
World Rhythmic Gymnastics Championships in Montpellier, France:
5 Balls:   (Uliana Donskova, Ksenia Dudkina, Olga Ilina, Alina Makarenko, Anastasia Nazarenko, Natalia Pichuzhkina) 28.000   (Elisa Blanchi, Romina Laurito, Marta Pagnini, Elisa Santoni, Anzhelika Savaryuk, Andreea Stefanescu) 27.000   (Reneta Kamberova, Mihaela Maevska, Tsvetelina Nayedorova, Elena Todorova, Hristiana Todorova, Katrin Velkova) 26.950
3 Ribbons + 2 Hoops:   27.400   26.725   (Moran Buzovski, Viktoriya Koshel, Noa Palatchy, Marina Shults, Polina Zakaluzny, Eliora Zholkovsky) 26.675
Israel win their first medal in groups event.

Motorcycle racing
Superbike:
Imola World Championship round in Imola, Italy:
Race 1: (1) Jonathan Rea  (Honda CBR1000RR) (2) Noriyuki Haga  (Ducati 1098R) (3) Carlos Checa  (Ducati 1098R)
Race 2: (1) Checa (2) Haga (3) Leon Camier  (Aprilia RSV4)
Riders' championship standings (after 11 of 13 rounds): (1) Checa 417 points (2) Marco Melandri  (Yamaha YZF-R1) 320 (3) Max Biaggi  (Aprilia RSV4) 281
Supersport:
Imola World Championship round in Imola, Italy: (1) Fabien Foret  (Honda CBR600RR) (2) Sam Lowes  (Honda CBR600RR) (3) Broc Parkes  (Kawasaki Ninja ZX-6R)
Riders' championship standings (after 10 of 12 rounds): (1) Chaz Davies  (Yamaha YZF-R6) 171 points (2) Foret 136 (3) David Salom  (Kawasaki Ninja ZX-6R) 123

Rugby league
Super League Play-offs:
Preliminary Semi-Final: Wigan Warriors 44–0 Catalans Dragons

Rugby union
World Cup in New Zealand (teams in bold qualify for 2015 World Cup):
Pool B in Wellington:  13–12 
Standings (after 3 matches unless stated):  14 points, Argentina, Scotland 10,  0 (2),  0.
Pool C in Rotorua:  62–12 
Standings (after 3 matches unless stated): Ireland 13 points,  10,  5 (2),  4, Russia 1.
Pool D in Auckland:  7–27 
Standings (after 3 matches unless stated):  14 points, Samoa 10,  5 (2), Fiji 5,  0.

Snooker
Players Tour Championship – Event 5 in Sheffield, England:
Final: Andrew Higginson  4–1 John Higgins 
Higginson wins his first professional title.
Order of Merit (after 5 of 12 events): (1) Ronnie O'Sullivan  14,400 (2) Mark Selby  12,200 (3) Higginson 12,000

Tennis
ATP World Tour:
Open de Moselle in Metz, France:
Final: Jo-Wilfried Tsonga  def. Ivan Ljubičić  6–3, 6–7(4), 6–3
Tsonga wins his sixth ATP Tour title.
BRD Năstase Țiriac Trophy in Bucharest, Romania:
Final: Florian Mayer  def. Pablo Andújar  6–3, 6–1
Mayer wins his first ATP Tour title.
WTA Tour:
Hansol Korea Open in Seoul, South Korea:
Final: María José Martínez Sánchez  def. Galina Voskoboeva  7–6(0), 7–6(2)
Martínez Sánchez wins her second title of the year and fifth of her career.
Guangzhou International Women's Open in Guangzhou, China:
Final: Chanelle Scheepers  def. Magdaléna Rybáriková  6–2, 6–2
Scheepers wins her first WTA Tour title.

Volleyball
Women's European Championship in Italy and Serbia (teams in bold advance to the quarterfinals, teams in italics advance to the playoffs):
Pool A in Belgrade, Serbia:
 0–3 
 3–0 
Standings (after 2 matches): Germany, Serbia 6 points, France, Ukraine 0.
Pool B in Monza, Italy:
 3–1 
 2–3 
Final standings: Italy 7 points, Turkey 5, Azerbaijan, Croatia 3.
Pool C in Zrenjanin, Serbia:
 3–0 
 0–3 
Standings (after 2 matches): Poland 6 points, Czech Republic, Romania 3, Israel 0.
Pool D in Busto Arsizio, Italy:
 3–1 
 3–0 
Final standings: Russia 9 points, Netherlands 6, Spain 3, Bulgaria 0.
Men's South American Championship in Cuiabá, Brazil:
 3–1 
 3–0 
 3–1 
Final standings:  Brazil 12 points,  Argentina 11,  Venezuela, Colombia,  9, Paraguay 7, Uruguay 6.
Brazil win the title for the 28th time.
Brazil and Argentina both qualify for the World Cup.
Men's Asian Championship in Tehran, Iran:
Pool E:
 1–3 
 3–0 
Standings (after 2 matches): Iran 6 points, India 3, Japan 2, Pakistan 1.
Pool F:
 3–0 
 2–3 
Standings (after 2 matches): Australia 5 points, China 4, South Korea 3, Sri Lanka 0.
Men's African Championship in Tangier, Morocco (teams in bold advance to the semifinals):
Group A:
 3–1 
 0–3 
Final standings: Cameroon 6 points, Tunisia 5, Morocco 4, Botswana 3.
Group B:
 3–0 
 3–0 
Final standings: Egypt 6 points, Algeria 5, Congo 4, South Africa 3.

September 24, 2011 (Saturday)

Australian rules football
AFL Finals Series:
Preliminary Final in Melbourne:  17.15 (117) – 10.9 (69)

Baseball
Major League Baseball news: The San Francisco Giants, the reigning World Series champion, are eliminated from postseason contention after a 15–2 loss to the Arizona Diamondbacks. Thus for the eleventh consecutive year, the previous World Series champions will not defend their title.

Basketball
FIBA Asia Championship in Wuhan, China:
Semifinals:
 75–61 
Jordan advances to the final for the first time.
 43–56 
FIBA Africa Championship for Women in Bamako, Mali:
Group A:
 0–20 
 76–55 
 44–57 
Standings (after 2 games unless stated): Mali, Mozambique 4 points, Tunisia 3, Côte d'Ivoire 2, DR Congo 1 (1), Ghana 0 (1).
Group B:
 60–31 
 45–42 
 42–63 
Standings (after 2 games unless stated): Senegal 4 points, Rwanda, Nigeria 3, Cameroon 2 (1), Guinea 2, Angola 1 (1).
FIBA Americas Championship for Women in Neiva, Colombia:
Group A:
 50–67 
 50–69 
Group B:
 117–34 
 45–72

Cricket
ICC Intercontinental Cup in Windhoek, day 2:  350 (115.4 overs; Christi Viljoen 5/94);  230/6 (74.0 overs). Namibia trail by 120 runs with 4 wickets remaining in the 1st innings.

Cycling
Road World Championships in Copenhagen, Denmark:
Road race Junior Men:  Pierre-Henri Lecuisinier  2h 48' 58"  Martijn Degreve  s.t.  Steven Lammertink  s.t.
Road race Elite Women:  Giorgia Bronzini  3h 21' 28"  Marianne Vos  s.t.  Ina-Yoko Teutenberg  s.t.
Bronzini wins the title for the second successive time.

Figure skating
ISU Junior Grand Prix:
JGP Brașov Cup in Brașov, Romania:
Men:   
Ice dancing:   
Standings (after 3 of 7 events): Victoria Sinitsina/Ruslan Zhiganshin , Nicole Orford/Thomas Williams , Maria Nosulia/Evgen Kholoniuk  15 points, Lauri Bonacorsi/Travis Mager , Anastasia Galyeta/Alexei Shumski , Evgenia Kosigina/Nikolai Moroshkin  13.

Golf
Solheim Cup in Dunshaughlin, County Meath, Ireland, day 2: Europe  8–8  United States
Morning Foursomes:
Caroline Hedwall/Sophie Gustafson  def. Angela Stanford/Stacy Lewis  6 and 5
Morgan Pressel/Ryann O'Toole  def. Karen Stupples/Christel Boeljon  3 and 2
Maria Hjorth/Anna Nordqvist  def. Brittany Lang/Juli Inkster  3 and 2
Cristie Kerr/Paula Creamer  and Catriona Matthew/Azahara Muñoz  match halved
Afternoon Fourball:
Laura Davies/Melissa Reid  def. Michelle Wie/Lang  3 and 2
Pressel/Kerr  def. Suzann Pettersen/Hedwall  1 up
Lewis/O'Toole  def. Sandra Gal/Boeljon  2 and 1
Creamer/Brittany Lincicome  def. Hjorth/Muñoz  3 and 1

Gymnastics
World Rhythmic Gymnastics Championships in Montpellier, France:
Groups all-around:   (Elisa Blanchi, Romina Laurito, Marta Pagnini, Elisa Santoni, Anzhelika Savaryuk, Andreea Stefanescu) 55.150   (Uliana Donskova, Ksenia Dudkina, Olga Ilina, Alina Makarenko, Anastasia Nazarenko, Natalia Pichuzhkina) 54.850   (Reneta Kamberova, Mihaela Maevska, Tsvetelina Nayedorova, Elena Todorova, Hristiana Todorova, Katrin Velkova) 54.125
Italy win the all-around title for the third successive time.

Mixed martial arts
UFC 135 in Denver, Colorado, United States:
Light Heavyweight Championship: Jon Jones  (c) def. Quinton Jackson  via submission (rear naked choke)
Welterweight bout: Josh Koscheck  def. Matt Hughes  via KO (punches)
Heavyweight bout: Mark Hunt  def. Ben Rothwell  via unanimous decision (29–28, 29–27, 30–27)
Heavyweight bout: Travis Browne  def. Rob Broughton  via unanimous decision (30–27, 30–27, 30–27)
Lightweight bout: Nate Diaz  def. Takanori Gomi  via submission (armbar)

Rugby league
NRL Finals Series:
Preliminary Final in Melbourne: Melbourne Storm  12–20  New Zealand Warriors

Rugby union
World Cup in New Zealand (team in bold qualify for quarter-finals):
Pool A in Auckland:  37–17 
Standings (after 3 matches unless stated): New Zealand 15 points, France 10,  5,  4 (2),  0.
Pool B in Dunedin:  67–3 
Standings (after 2 matches unless stated): England 14 points (3 matches),  9,  6,  0, Romania 0 (3).

Volleyball
Women's European Championship in Italy and Serbia:
Pool A in Belgrade, Serbia:
 3–0 
 1–3 
Pool B in Monza, Italy:
 3–0 
 3–1 
Standings (after 2 matches): Italy 6 points, Croatia, Turkey 3, Azerbaijan 0.
Pool C in Zrenjanin, Serbia:
 0–3 
 0–3 
Pool D in Busto Arsizio, Italy:
 0–3 
 3–1 
Standings (after 2 matches): Netherlands, Russia 6 points, Spain, Bulgaria 0.
Men's South American Championship in Cuiabá, Brazil:
 3–0 
 3–1 
 3–0 
Standings (after 5 matches unless stated): Brazil,  10 points, Chile 9 (6), Venezuela, Colombia 7, Paraguay 6, Uruguay 5.
Brazil and Argentina both qualify for the World Cup.
Men's African Championship in Tangier, Morocco:
Group A:
 0–3 
 1–3 
Standings (after 2 matches): Cameroon 4 points, Tunisia, Morocco 3, Botswana 2.
Group B:
 3–0 
 3–1 
Standings (after 2 matches): Egypt 4 points, Algeria, Congo 3, South Africa 2.

September 23, 2011 (Friday)

Australian rules football
AFL Finals Series:
Preliminary Final in Melbourne:  10.8 (68)–9.11 (65)

Baseball
Major League Baseball news:
The Texas Rangers clinch their second consecutive American League West title with a 5–3 win over the Seattle Mariners.
The Milwaukee Brewers clinch their first National League Central title with a 4–1 win over the Florida Marlins.
The Arizona Diamondbacks clinch their fifth National League West title, and first since 2007, with a 3–1 win over the San Francisco Giants.

Basketball
FIBA Asia Championship in Wuhan, China:
Quarterfinals:
 88–84 
 86–67 
 95–78 
 48–68 
FIBA Africa Championship for Women in Bamako, Mali:
Group A:
 65–69 (OT) 
 69–41 
Group B:
 69–35 
 86–62

Cricket
West Indies in England:
1st T20I in London:  125 (19.4 overs);  128/0 (15.2 overs). England win by 10 wickets; lead 2-match series 1–0.
ICC Intercontinental Cup in Windhoek, day 1:  268/7 (96 overs; Ryan Flannigan 102); .

Cycling
Road World Championships in Copenhagen, Denmark:
Road race Junior Women:  Lucy Garner  1:46:17  Jessy Druyts  s.t.  Christina Siggaard  s.t.
Road race Under 23 Men:  Arnaud Démare  3:52:16  Adrien Petit  s.t.  Andrew Fenn  s.t.

Figure skating
ISU Junior Grand Prix:
JGP Brașov Cup in Brașov, Romania:
Ladies:  Polina Shelepen  157.61  Polina Korobeynikova  149.87  Kim Hae-jin  144.61
Standings (after 4 of 7 events): Shelepen 30 points (2 events), Korobeynikova 22 (2), Kim 18 (2), Yulia Lipnitskaya , Courtney Hicks  15 (1), Satoko Miyahara , Li Zijun , Risa Shoji  13 (1).

Golf
Solheim Cup in Dunshaughlin, County Meath, Ireland, day 1: Europe  4½–3½  United States
Morning Foursomes:
Michelle Wie/Cristie Kerr  def. Maria Hjorth/Anna Nordqvist  2 & 1
Paula Creamer/Brittany Lincicome  def. Karen Stupples/Melissa Reid  1 up
Catriona Matthew/Azahara Muñoz  def. Stacy Lewis/Angela Stanford  3 & 2
Suzann Pettersen/Sophie Gustafson  def. Brittany Lang/Juli Inkster  1 up
Afternoon Fourball:
Morgan Pressel/Creamer  def. Laura Davies/Reid  1 up
Christina Kim/Ryann O'Toole  and Matthew/Sandra Gal  match halved
Gustafson/Caroline Hedwall  def. Vicky Hurst/Lincicome  5 & 4
Pettersen/Nordqvist  def. Wie/Kerr  2 & 1

Gymnastics
World Rhythmic Gymnastics Championships in Montpellier, France (RUS unless stated):
Individual all-around:  Yevgeniya Kanayeva 116.650  Daria Kondakova 116.600  Aliya Garayeva  112.450
Kabayeva wins her sixth title of the championships and equals her record in 2009. She also wins her third successive all-around title and 17th world title overall.

Rugby league
NRL Finals Series:
Preliminary Final in Sydney: Manly-Warringah Sea Eagles  26–14  Brisbane Broncos
Super League Play-offs:
Preliminary Semi-Finals: Huddersfield Giants 28–34 Leeds Rhinos

Rugby union
World Cup in New Zealand:
Pool C in Wellington:  67–5 
Standings (after 2 matches unless stated): Australia 10 points (3 matches),  8,  5, United States 4 (3),  1.

Volleyball
Women's European Championship in Italy and Serbia:
Pool B in Monza, Italy:
 3–1 
 3–0 
Pool D in Busto Arsizio, Italy:
 3–0 
 3–0 
Women's Asian Championship in Taipei, Chinese Taipei:
Bronze medal match:   3–2 
Final:   3–1  
China win the title for the 12th time.
Men's South American Championship in Cuiabá, Brazil:
 3–0 
 3–2 
 3–0 
Standings (after 4 matches unless stated): Argentina 10 points (5 matches),  8, Chile 7 (5), Venezuela 6, Colombia, Paraguay 5, Uruguay 4.
Argentina qualifies for the World Cup.
Men's Asian Championship in Tehran, Iran (teams in bold advance to the quarterfinals):
Pool A:
 3–0 
 0–3 
Final standings: Iran 9 points, India 5, Chinese Taipei 4, Afghanistan 0.
Pool B:
 3–2 
 3–0 
Final standings: China 9 points, Sri Lanka 5, Indonesia 4, Uzbekistan 0.
Pool C:
 0–3 
 3–0 
Final standings: Japan 8 points, Pakistan 6, Kazakhstan 3, Thailand 1.
Pool D:
 0–3 
 0–3 
Final standings: Australia 8 points, South Korea 7, Qatar 3, Turkmenistan 0.
Men's African Championship in Tangier, Morocco:
Group A:
 3–2 
 3–0 
Group B:
 3–0 
 3–1

September 22, 2011 (Thursday)

Football (soccer)
UEFA Women's Euro 2013 qualifying Matchday 2:
Group 2:  2–0 
Standings (after 2 matches unless stated): ,  3 points (1 match), Kazakhstan 3, Turkey 0.
Group 4:  1–3 
Standings: France 6 points (2 matches), Ireland 3 (2), Scotland 0 (0), Wales, Israel 0 (1).
Group 6:  4–0 
Standings: England 4 points (2 matches),  3 (1),  1 (2), Slovenia 0 (0),  0 (1).
Copa Sudamericana Second stage, second leg (first leg score in parentheses):
Deportivo Cali  1–1 (1–1)  Santa Fe. 2–2 on points, 2–2 on aggregate; Santa Fe win 6–5 on penalties.
Trujillanos  0–1 (1–4)  LDU Quito. LDU Quito win 6–0 on points.
CONCACAF Champions League Group Stage Matchday 4:
Group A: Motagua  0–2  Morelia
Standings (after 4 matches): Morelia,  Alajuelense 9 points,  Los Angeles Galaxy 6, Motagua 0.
Group B: Santos Laguna  6–0  Isidro Metapán
Standings (after 4 matches): Santos Laguna 9 points, Isidro Metapán 6,  Real España,  Colorado Rapids 4.

Gymnastics
World Rhythmic Gymnastics Championships in Montpellier, France (RUS unless stated):
Clubs:  Yevgeniya Kanayeva 29.600  Daria Kondakova 29.300  Silviya Miteva  28.300
Ribbon:  Kanayeva 29.400  Kondakova 29.250  Miteva 28.300
Kabayeva wins the ribbon event for the second time.
Teams:   (Kanayeva, Kondakova, Daria Dmitrieva, Alexandra Merkulova) 290.275   (Liubov Charkashyna, Melitina Staniouta, Aliana Narkevich, Hanna Rabtsava) 272.500   (Alina Maksymenko, Ganna Rizatdinova, Victoriya Mazur, Victoriia Shynkarenko) 269.675
Kanayeva wins her fifth title of the championships, and her fourth team title and 16th world title overall.
Kondakova and Dmitrieva both win their third team title and fourth world title overall.

Rugby union
World Cup in New Zealand:
Pool D in Auckland:  87–0 
Standings (after 2 matches unless stated): South Africa 14 points (3 matches),  6,  5, Namibia 0 (3).
South Africa qualifies for 2015 World Cup.

Volleyball
Women's Asian Championship in Taipei, Chinese Taipei:
Semifinals:
 3–2 
 3–1 
China qualifies for the World Cup.
Men's South American Championship in Cuiabá, Brazil:
 3–0 
 3–0 
 3–0 
Standings (after 3 matches unless stated): Brazil, Argentina 8 points (4 matches), Chile 5 (4), Venezuela, Colombia, Paraguay 4,  3.
Men's Asian Championship in Tehran, Iran (teams in bold advance to the quarterfinals):
Pool A:
 3–0 
 0–3 
Standings (after 2 matches): Iran 6 points, India 5, Chinese Taipei 1, Afghanistan 0.
Pool B:
 0–3 
 0–3 
Standings (after 2 matches): China 6 points, Sri Lanka, Indonesia 3, Uzbekistan 0.
Pool C:
 2–3 
 3–2 
Standings (after 2 matches): Japan 5 points, Kazakhstan, Pakistan 3, Thailand 1.
Pool D:
 3–0 
 3–0 
Standings (after 2 matches): Australia 5 points, South Korea 4, Qatar 3, Turkmenistan 0.

September 21, 2011 (Wednesday)

Baseball
Major League Baseball news: The New York Yankees clinch a playoff berth with a 4–2 win over the Tampa Bay Rays.

Basketball
FIBA Asia Championship in Wuhan, China (teams in bold qualify for quarterfinals):
Group E:
 101–53 
 62–109 
 62–79 
Final standings: Iran 10 points, Korea 9 points, Chinese Taipei 8, Lebanon 7, Malaysia 6, Uzbekistan 5.
Group F:
 94–80 
 52–75 
 58–84 
Final standings: China 10 points, Philippines 9, Japan 8, Jordan 7, Syria 6, United Arab Emirates 5.

Cycling
Road World Championships in Copenhagen, Denmark:
Time trial Elite Men:  Tony Martin  53:43.85  Bradley Wiggins  54:59.68  Fabian Cancellara  55:04.44

Football (soccer)
UEFA Women's Euro 2013 qualifying Matchday 2:
Group 1:  0–2 
Group 2:  4–1 
Standings (after 1 match unless stated): ,  3 points, Switzerland, Romania 3 (2),  0.
Group 3:
 6–0 
 0–0 
Standings: Iceland 7 points (3 matches), Belgium 4 (2), Norway 3 (2),  0 (0),  0 (1), Hungary 0 (2).
Group 6:  6–0 
Standings: Netherlands 3 points (1 match),  1 (1), Serbia 1 (2),  0 (0).
Group 7:  0–5 
Standings (after 1 match unless stated): Portugal,  3 points,  1, Armenia 0 (2).
2012 Olympics Men's Asian Qualifiers Preliminary Round 3, Matchday 1:
Group A:
 2–0 
 1–1 
Group B:
 2–0 
 0–0 
Group C:
 2–0 
 3–1 
Copa Sudamericana Second stage, second leg (first leg scores in parentheses):
Nacional  0–2 (0–1)  Universidad de Chile — match abandoned due to crowd trouble
Libertad  1–0 (1–0)  La Equidad. Libertad win 6–0 on points.
CONCACAF Champions League Group Stage Matchday 4:
Group A: Alajuelense  1–0  Los Angeles Galaxy
Standings: Alajuense 9 points (4 matches),  Morelia 6 (3), Los Angeles Galaxy 6 (4),  Motagua 0 (3).
Group B: Colorado Rapids  1–2  Real España
Standings:  Santos Laguna,  Isidro Metapán 6 points (3 matches), Real España, Colorado Rapids 4 (4).
Group C: FC Dallas  0–2  UNAM
Standings (after 4 matches): UNAM, FC Dallas 7 points,  Toronto FC 6,  Tauro 2.

Rugby union
World Cup in New Zealand:
Pool A in Whangarei:  31–18 
Standings (after 2 matches unless stated): ,  10 points, Tonga 5 (3),  4, Japan 0 (3).

Surfing
Men's World Tour:
Hurley Pro in Trestles, California, United States: (1) Kelly Slater  (2) Owen Wright  (3) Heitor Alves  & Julian Wilson 
Standings (after 7 of 11 events): (1) Slater 44,950 points (2) Wright 39,900 (3) Joel Parkinson  35,400

Volleyball
Women's Asian Championship in Taipei, Chinese Taipei:
Quarterfinals:
 3–0 
 3–0 
 0–3 
 3–1 
Men's South American Championship in Cuiabá, Brazil:
 3–0 
 3–0 
 3–0 
Standings (after 3 matches unless stated): Brazil, Argentina 6 points, Venezuela, Paraguay 3 (2), Chile, Uruguay 3.
Men's Asian Championship in Tehran, Iran:
Pool A:
 3–2 
 0–3 
Pool B:
 3–0 
 3–1 
Pool C:
 3–0 
 3–2 
Pool D:
 3–0 
 3–2

September 20, 2011 (Tuesday)

Basketball
FIBA Asia Championship in Wuhan, China (teams in bold qualify for quarterfinals):
Group E:
 75–80 
 76–45 
 61–82 
Standings (after 4 games): Iran, South Korea 8 points, Chinese Taipei 6, Lebanon, Malaysia 5, Uzbekistan 4.
Group F:
 73–80 
 83–76 
 93–60 
Standings (after 4 games): China 8 points, Philippines, Japan 7, Jordan, Syria 5, United Arab Emirates 4.

Cricket
Australia in Sri Lanka:
3rd Test in Colombo, day 5:  316 & 488 (138.5 overs, Phillip Hughes 126, Michael Clarke 112);  473 & 7/0 (2 overs). Match drawn, Australia win the series 1–0.
ICC Intercontinental Cup One-Day:
8th ODI in Dublin:  249/7 (50 overs);  193 (46.3 overs). Ireland win by 56 runs.
Standings (after 4 matches unless stated): Ireland 8 points,  4 (2),  4,  2,  2 (2),  0 (2), Canada 0.

Cycling
Road World Championships in Copenhagen, Denmark:
Time trial Junior Men:  Mads Würtz Schmidt  35:07.68  James Oram  35:11.79  David Edwards  35:28.47
Time trial Elite Women:  Judith Arndt  37:07.38  Linda Villumsen  37:29.11  Emma Pooley  37:31.51
Arndt wins her second world championship title.

Football (soccer)
Copa Sudamericana Second stage second leg (first leg scores in parentheses):
Emelec  1–2 (1–2)  Olimpia. Olimpia win 6–0 on points.
Aurora  5–2 (1–1)  Nacional. Aurora win 4–1 on points.
CONCACAF Champions League Group Stage Matchday 4:
Group C: Toronto FC  1–0  Tauro
Standings:  FC Dallas 7 points (3 matches), Toronto 6 (4),  UNAM 4 (3), Tauro 2 (4).
Group D:
Monterrey  3–1  Comunicaciones
Seattle Sounders  0–1  Herediano
Standings (after 4 matches): Seattle Sounders 9 points, Monterrey, Comunicaciones 6, Herediano 3.

Gymnastics
World Rhythmic Gymnastics Championships in Montpellier, France (RUS unless stated):
Hoop:  Yevgeniya Kanayeva 29.300  Daria Kondakova 29.050  Neta Rivkin  28.000
Rivkin becomes the first world championship medallist from Israel.
Ball:  Kanayeva 29.600  Kondakova 29.325  Liubov Charkashyna  28.450
Kanayeva wins both events for the third time and increases her record to 13 world titles overall.

Rugby union
World Cup in New Zealand:
Pool C in Nelson:  53–17 
Standings (after 2 matches):  8 points, Italy 5,  4, Russia 1.

Volleyball
Men's South American Championship in Cuiabá, Brazil:
 3–0 
 0–3 
 3–0 
Standings (after 2 matches unless stated): Brazil, Argentina 4 points, Colombia 3, Paraguay 2 (1), Chile, Uruguay 2, Venezuela 1 (1).

September 19, 2011 (Monday)

American football
NFL Monday Night Football, Week 2: New York Giants 28, St. Louis Rams 16

Auto racing
Sprint Cup Series – Chase for the Sprint Cup:
GEICO 400 in Joliet, Illinois: (1)  Tony Stewart (Chevrolet; Stewart Haas Racing) (2)  Kevin Harvick (Chevrolet; Richard Childress Racing) (3)  Dale Earnhardt Jr. (Chevrolet; Hendrick Motorsports)
Drivers' championship standings (after 27 of 36 races): (1) Harvick 2054 points (2) Stewart 2047 (3)  Carl Edwards (Ford; Roush Fenway Racing) 2044

Baseball
Major League Baseball news: New York Yankees closer Mariano Rivera earns his 602th career save, breaking Trevor Hoffman's record for most career saves.

Basketball
FIBA Asia Championship in Wuhan, China (teams in bold qualify for quarterfinals):
Group E:
 36–121 
 58–60 
 106–57 
Standings (after 3 games): Iran, South Korea 6 points, Chinese Taipei 5, Lebanon 4, Malaysia, Uzbekistan 3.
Group F:
 64–72 
 101–61 
 71–90 
Standings (after 3 games): Japan, China 6 points, Philippines 5, Jordan 4, Syria, United Arab Emirates 3.

Cricket
Australia in Sri Lanka:
3rd Test in Colombo, day 4:  316 & 209/3 (68 overs; Phillip Hughes 122*);  473 (174 overs; Angelo Mathews 105*). Australia lead by 52 runs with 7 wickets remaining.
ICC Intercontinental Cup One-Day:
7th ODI in Dublin:  328/6 (50 overs);  195 (48.4 overs). Ireland win by 133 runs.
Standings: Ireland 6 points (3 matches),  4 (2),  4 (4),  2 (4),  2 (2),  0 (2), Canada 0 (3).

Cycling
Road World Championships in Copenhagen, Denmark:
Time trial Junior Women:  Jessica Allen  19:18.63  Elinor Barker  19:20.47  Mieke Kröger  19:21.43
Time trial Under 23 Men:  Luke Durbridge  42:47.13  Rasmus Quaade  43:22.81  Michael Hepburn  43:33.60

Tennis
Davis Cup World Group Play-offs, day 3 (team in bold will play in 2012 World Group):  2–3

Volleyball
Women's Asian Championship in Taipei, Chinese Taipei:
Pool E:
 3–0 
 0–3 
Final standings: China 9 points, Chinese Taipei 6, North Korea 3, Iran 0.
Pool F:
 3–0 
 0–3 
Final standings: Japan 8 points, South Korea 7, Thailand 3, Vietnam 0.
Men's South American Championship in Cuiabá, Brazil:
 3–0 
 3–0 
 2–3

September 18, 2011 (Sunday)

American football
NFL week 2:
Cleveland Browns 27, Indianapolis Colts 19
Buffalo Bills 38, Oakland Raiders 35
Detroit Lions 48, Kansas City Chiefs 3
New Orleans Saints 30, Chicago Bears 13
Tampa Bay Buccaneers 24, Minnesota Vikings 20
Green Bay Packers 30, Carolina Panthers 23
Pittsburgh Steelers 24, Seattle Seahawks 0
Tennessee Titans 26, Baltimore Ravens 13
Washington Redskins 22, Arizona Cardinals 21
New York Jets 32, Jacksonville Jaguars 3
Dallas Cowboys 27, San Francisco 49ers 24 (OT)
Denver Broncos 24, Cincinnati Bengals 22
New England Patriots 35, San Diego Chargers 21
Houston Texans 23, Miami Dolphins 13
Sunday Night Football: Atlanta Falcons 35, Philadelphia Eagles 31

Auto racing
Sprint Cup Series – Chase for the Sprint Cup:
GEICO 400 in Joliet, Illinois: Race postponed to 12:00 pm EDT on September 19 due to rain.
IndyCar Series:
Indy Japan: The Final in Motegi, Japan: (1) Scott Dixon  (Chip Ganassi Racing) (2) Will Power  (Team Penske) (3) Marco Andretti  (Andretti Autosport)
Drivers' championship standings (after 16 of 18 races): (1) Power 542 points (2) Dario Franchitti  (Chip Ganassi Racing) 531 (3) Dixon 483
Final road course standings: (1) Power 397 points (2) Franchitti 367 (3) Dixon 302
V8 Supercars:
L&H 500 in Phillip Island, Victoria (all AUS): (1) Craig Lowndes/Mark Skaife (Triple Eight Race Engineering; Holden VE Commodore) (2) Jamie Whincup/Andrew Thompson (Triple Eight Race Engineering; Holden VE Commodore) (3) Will Davison/Luke Youlden (Ford Performance Racing; Ford FG Falcon)
Drivers' championship standings (after 19 of 28 races): (1) Whincup 2145 points (2) Lowndes 2053 (3) Shane van Gisbergen  (Stone Brothers Racing; Ford FG Falcon) 1716

Badminton
BWF Super Series:
China Masters Super Series in Changzhou:
Men's singles: Chen Long  def. Chen Jin  21–16, 22–20
Women's singles: Wang Shixian  def. Jiang Yanjiao  21–16, 8–5 Ret.
Men's doubles: Jung Jae-sung/Lee Yong-dae  def. Cai Yun/Fu Haifeng  21–17, 21–10
Women's doubles: Huan Xia/Tang Jinhua  def. Wang Xiaoli/Yu Yang  21–19 Ret.
Mixed doubles: Xu Chen/Ma Jin  def. Yoo Yeon-seong/Jang Ye-na  21–13, 21–16

Basketball
EuroBasket in Kaunas, Lithuania:
Bronze medal game:  68–72  
Final:   98–85  
Spain win the title for the second successive time.
Spain and France both qualify for 2012 Olympics.

College sports
The Atlantic Coast Conference votes to accept the University of Pittsburgh and Syracuse University's applications for membership. Pitt and Syracuse are to leave the Big East Conference.

Cricket
Australia in Sri Lanka:
3rd Test in Colombo, day 3:  316;  428/6 (155 overs). Sri Lanka lead by 112 runs with 4 wickets remaining in the 1st innings.
Pakistan in Zimbabwe:
2nd T20 in Harare:  141/7 (20 overs);  136/7 (20 overs). Pakistan win by 5 runs; win 2-match series 2–0.

Equestrianism
European Show Jumping Championship in Madrid:
Individual result:  Rolf-Göran Bengtsson  on Ninja  Carsten-Otto Nagel  on Corradina  Nick Skelton  on Carlo

Football (soccer)
2014 FIFA World Cup qualification – CONCACAF Second Round Group E:  2–1 
Standings (after 2 matches):  6 points, Saint Vincent and the Grenadines 3, Grenada 0.
UEFA Women's Euro 2013 qualifying Matchday 1:
Group 5:  1–4 
Standings: Ukraine,  3 points (1 match),  0 (0), Estonia 0 (2).
CAF Champions League Group stage Matchday 6 (teams in bold advance to the semifinals):
Group A:
Raja Casablanca  0–0  Al-Hilal
Enyimba  2–0  Coton Sport
Final standings: Enyimba 14 points, Al-Hilal 8, Coton Sport 7, Raja Casablanca 3.
CAF Confederation Cup Group stage Matchday 6 (teams in bold advance to the semifinals):
Group A:
Kaduna United  0–1  Club Africain
ASEC Mimosas  1–0  Inter Luanda
Final standings: Club Africain 11 points, Inter Luanda 10, ASEC Mimosas 7, Kaduna United 5.

Gaelic football
All-Ireland Championship Final in Dublin: Kerry 1–11 – 1–12 Dublin
Dublin win the title for the first time since 1995, and 23rd time overall.

Golf
PGA Tour:
FedEx Cup Playoffs: BMW Championship in Lemont, Illinois:
Winner: Justin Rose  271 (−13)
Rose wins his third PGA Tour title.
FedEx Cup points: (1) Webb Simpson  5261 points (2) Dustin Johnson  3841 (3) Rose 3748
European Tour:
Vivendi Trophy with Seve Ballesteros in Saint-Nom-la-Bretèche, France: Great Britain & Ireland  15½–12½  Continental Europe
Great Britain & Ireland win for the sixth successive time.
LPGA Tour:
Navistar LPGA Classic in Prattville, Alabama:
Winner: Lexi Thompson  271 (−17)
Champions Tour:
Songdo IBD Championship in Incheon, South Korea:
Winner: Jay Don Blake  203 (−13)PO
Blake wins a four-man playoff to win his first Champions Tour title.

Motorcycle racing
Moto GP:
Aragon Grand Prix in Alcañiz, Spain (ESP unless stated):
MotoGP: (1) Casey Stoner  (Honda) (2) Dani Pedrosa (Honda) (3) Jorge Lorenzo (Yamaha)
Riders' championship standings (after 14 of 18 races): (1) Stoner 284 points (2) Lorenzo 240 (3) Andrea Dovizioso  (Honda) 185
Moto2: (1) Marc Márquez (Suter) (2) Andrea Iannone  (Suter) (3) Simone Corsi  (FTR)
Riders' championship standings (after 13 of 17 races): (1) Stefan Bradl  (Kalex) 221 points (2) Márquez 215 (3) Iannone 132
125cc: (1) Nicolás Terol (Aprilia) (2) Johann Zarco  (Derbi) (3) Maverick Viñales (Aprilia)
Riders' championship standings (after 13 of 17 races): (1) Terol 241 points (2) Zarco 205 (3) Viñales 177

Rugby league
Super League Play-offs:
Qualifying and Elimination Finals:
Leeds Rhinos 42–10 Hull
Wigan Warriors 18–26 St. Helens

Rugby union
World Cup in New Zealand:
Pool A in Napier:  46–19 
Standings (after 2 matches): , France 10 points, Canada 4,  1,  0.
Pool B in Dunedin:  41–10 
Standings (after 2 matches): England,  9 points,  6, Georgia,  0.
Pool D in Hamilton:  17–10 
Standings (after 2 matches):  9 points, Samoa 6, Wales,  5,  0.

Snooker
Brazil Masters in Florianópolis, Brazil:
Semi-finals:
Peter Ebdon  2–5 Graeme Dott 
Shaun Murphy  5–1 Stephen Hendry 
Final: Dott 0–5 Murphy
Murphy wins his 12th professional title.

Tennis
Davis Cup World Group Semifinals, day 3:
 2–3 
 4–1 
Spain and Argentina will meet in a repeat of 2008 Final.
Davis Cup World Group Play-offs, day 3 (teams in bold will play in 2012 World Group):
 0–5 
 3–2 
 2–3 
 1–4 
 1–4 
 4–1 
 1–4 
 2–2  – Play suspended due to darkness
WTA Tour:
Bell Challenge in Quebec City, Canada:
Final: Barbora Záhlavová-Strýcová  def. Marina Erakovic  4–6, 6–1, 6–0.
Záhlavová-Strýcová wins her first career title.

Volleyball
Men's European Championship in Vienna, Austria:
Bronze medal match:   3–1 
Final:   1–3  
Serbia win the title for the second time.
Serbia and Italy both qualify for the World Cup.
Women's Asian Championship in Taipei, Chinese Taipei:
Pool E:
 3–1 
 3–0 
Standings (after 2 matches): China, Chinese Taipei 6 points, North Korea, Iran 0.
Pool F:
 1–3 
 3–0 
Standings (after 2 matches): Japan 5 points, South Korea 4, Thailand 3, Vietnam 0.

Wrestling
World Championships in Istanbul, Turkey:
Men's freestyle:
66 kg:  Mehdi Taghavi   Tatsuhiro Yonemitsu   Jabrayil Hasanov  & Liván López 
Taghavi wins the title for the second time.
74 kg:  Jordan Burroughs   Sadegh Goudarzi   Ashraf Aliyev  & Davit Khutsishvili 
120 kg:  Aleksey Shemarov   Beylal Makhov   Jamaladdin Magomedov  & Davit Modzmanashvili

September 17, 2011 (Saturday)

American football
NCAA AP Top 10:
(1) Oklahoma 23, (5) Florida State 13
(2) Alabama 41, North Texas 0
(6) Stanford 37, Arizona 0
In Chicago: (7) Wisconsin 49, Northern Illinois 7
(8) Oklahoma State 59, Tulsa 33
(9) Texas A&M 37, Idaho 7
(10) South Carolina 24, Navy 21
Other games:
Clemson 38, (21) Auburn 24
Notre Dame 31, (15) Michigan State 13

Australian rules football
AFL Finals Series:
First Semi-Final in Perth:  15.11 (101)–15.8 (98)

Auto racing
Nationwide Series:
Dollar General 300 in Joliet, Illinois: (1)  Brad Keselowski (Dodge; Penske Racing) (2)  Carl Edwards (Ford; Roush Fenway Racing) (3)  Brian Scott (Toyota; Joe Gibbs Racing)
Drivers' championship standings (after 28 of 34 races): (1)  Ricky Stenhouse Jr. (Ford; Roush Fenway Racing) 986 points (2)  Elliott Sadler (Chevrolet; Kevin Harvick Incorporated) 972 (3)  Reed Sorenson (Chevrolet; Turner Motorsports) 939

Basketball
EuroBasket in Kaunas, Lithuania:
Seventh place game:  72–68 
Fifth place game:  73–69 
FIBA Asia Championship in Wuhan, China (teams in bold advance to the Second Round):
Group A:
 84–53 
 59–87 
Final standings: South Korea 6 points, Lebanon 5, Malaysia 4, India 3.
Group B:
 94–78 
 132–38 
Final standings: Iran 6 points, Chinese Taipei 5, Uzbekistan 4, Qatar 3.
Group C:
 55–77 
 89–59 
Final standings: Japan 6 points, Jordan 5, Syria 4, Indonesia 3.
Group D:
 71–113 
 75–60 
Final standings: China 6 points, Philippines 5, United Arab Emirates 4, Bahrain 3.

Cricket
Australia in Sri Lanka:
3rd Test in Colombo, day 2:  316 (104.3 overs, Michael Hussey 118);  166/2 (65 overs). Sri Lanka trail by 150 runs with 8 wickets remaining in the 1st innings.
 Clydesdale Bank 40 Final in London: Somerset 214 (39.2 overs); Surrey Lions 189/5 (27.3/30 overs). Surrey win by 5 wickets (D/L).

Figure skating
ISU Junior Grand Prix:
JGP Baltic Cup in Gdańsk, Poland:
Men:  Joshua Farris  202.45  Artur Dmitriev Jr.  197.09  Ryuichi Kihara  173.31
Standings (after 3 of 7 events): Farris, Jason Brown , Ryuju Hino  15 points, Dmitriev, Keiji Tanaka , Zhang He  13.
Ice dancing:  Victoria Sinitsina/Ruslan Zhiganshin  140.31  Anastasia Galyeta/Alexei Shumski  122.90  Anna Yanovskaia/Sergei Mozgov  121.72
Standings (after 3 of 7 events): Sinitsina/Zhiganshin, Nicole Orford/Thomas Williams , Maria Nosulia/Evgen Kholoniuk  15 points, Lauri Bonacorsi/Travis Mager , Galyeta/Shumski, Evgenia Kosigina/Nikolai Moroshkin  13.

Football (soccer)
UEFA Women's Euro 2013 qualifying Matchday 1:
Group 1:  0–1 
Group 2:
 0–3 
 4–1 
 1–10 
Group 3:
 2–1 
 3–1 
Standings: Iceland 6 points (2 matches), Belgium 3 (1),  0 (0), Hungary, Norway,  0 (1).
Group 4:  0–2 
Group 6:  2–2 
Group 7:
 0–8 
 1–1 
CAF Confederation Cup Group stage Matchday 6 (teams in bold advance to the semifinals):
Group B:
Sunshine Stars  1–0  JS Kabylie
Maghreb de Fès  3–0   Motema Pembe
Final standings: Maghreb de Fès 14 points, Sunshine Stars 11, Motema Pembe 8, JS Kabylie 0.

Mixed martial arts
UFC Fight Night: Shields vs. Ellenberger in New Orleans, Louisiana, United States:
Welterweight bout: Jake Ellenberger  def. Jake Shields  via TKO (strikes)
Middleweight bout: Court McGee  def. Yang Dongi  via unanimous decision (30–27, 29–28, 30–28)
Featherweight bout: Erik Koch  def. Jonathan Brookins  via unanimous decision (30–27, 29–28, 30–27)
Middleweight bout: Alan Belcher  def. Jason MacDonald  via submission (strikes)

Rugby league
NRL Finals Series:
Semi-Final: Brisbane Broncos  13–12  St. George Illawarra Dragons
Super League Play-offs:
Qualifying and Elimination Finals: Catalans Dragons 56–6 Hull Kingston Rovers

Rugby union
World Cup in New Zealand:
Pool B in Invercargill:  43–8 
Standings (after 2 matches unless stated):  9 points, Argentina 6,  4 (1),  0 (1), Romania 0.
Pool C in Auckland:  6–15 
Standings (after 2 matches unless stated): Ireland 8 points, Australia 5,  4,  1 (1),  0 (1).
Pool D in Wellington:  49–3 
Standings (after 2 matches unless stated): South Africa 9 points,  5 (1), Fiji 5,  1 (1),  0.

Snooker
Brazil Masters in Florianópolis, Brazil, quarter-finals:
Mark Selby  3–4 Peter Ebdon 
Igor Figueiredo  2–4 Graeme Dott 
Shaun Murphy  4–1 Ricky Walden 
Stephen Hendry  4–0 Ali Carter

Tennis
Davis Cup World Group Semifinals, day 2:
 1–2 
 2–1 
Davis Cup World Group Play-offs, day 2 (teams in bold will play in 2012 World Group):
 0–3 
 1–2 
 1–2 
 1–2 
 0–3 
 2–1 
 1–2 
 2–1 
WTA Tour:
Tashkent Open in Tashkent, Uzbekistan:
Final: Ksenia Pervak  def. Eva Birnerová  6–3, 6–1
Pervak wins her first career title.

Volleyball
Men's European Championship in Vienna, Austria:
Semifinals:
 3–0 
 3–2 
Italy and Serbia both qualify for the World Cup.
Women's NORCECA Championship in Caguas, Puerto Rico:
Bronze medal match:   3–0 
Final:   3–0  
The United States win the title for the sixth time.
The United States and Dominican Republic both qualify for the World Cup.
Women's Asian Championship in Taipei, Chinese Taipei (teams in bold advance to the quarterfinals):
Pool A:  2–3 
Final standings:  6 points, Iran 2, Indonesia 1.
Pool B:  3–0 
Final standings: Thailand 6 points,  3, Australia 0.
Pool C:
 1–3 
 0–3 
Final standings: China 9 points, North Korea 6, Kazakhstan 3, India 0.
Pool D:  2–3 
Final standings: Japan 5 points, South Korea 4,  0.

Wrestling
World Championships in Istanbul, Turkey:
Men's freestyle:
60 kg:  Besik Kudukhov   Franklin Gómez   Kenichi Yumoto  & Dauren Zhumagaziyev 
Kudukhov wins the title for the fourth time.
84 kg:  Sharif Sharifov   Ibragim Aldatov   Dato Marsagishvili  & Albert Saritov 
96 kg:  Reza Yazdani   Serhat Balcı   Ruslan Sheikhau  & Jake Varner

September 16, 2011 (Friday)

Athletics
IAAF Diamond League:
Memorial Van Damme in Brussels, Belgium:
Men:
100m: Usain Bolt  9.76
200m: Yohan Blake  19.26
Blake records the second-fastest time ever.
Final Diamond Race standings: (1) Walter Dix  16 points (2) Blake 8 (3) Jaysuma Saidy Ndure  5
400m: Jonathan Borlée  44.78
400m hurdles: Javier Culson  48.32
Final Diamond Race standings: (1) Dai Greene  16 points (2) Culson 15 (3) Cornel Fredericks  4
800m: David Rudisha  1:43.96
Final Diamond Race standings: (1) Rudisha 16 points (2) Asbel Kiprop  8 (3) Alfred Kirwa Yego  5
5000m: Imane Merga  12:58.32
Final Diamond Race standings: (1) Merga 15 points (2) Vincent Chepkok  7 (3) Dejen Gebremeskel  4
10,000m: Kenenisa Bekele  26:43.16
Javelin throw: Matthias de Zordo  88.36m
Final Diamond Race standings: (1) de Zordo 17 points (2) Andreas Thorkildsen  14 (3) Vadims Vasiļevskis  4
Pole vault: Konstadinos Filippidis  5.72m
Final Diamond Race standings: (1) Renaud Lavillenie  20 points (2) Malte Mohr  12 (3) Filippidis 10
Shot put: Reese Hoffa  22.09m
Final Diamond Race standings: (1) Dylan Armstrong  17 points (2) Hoffa 16 (3) Christian Cantwell  11
Triple jump: Benjamin Compaoré  17.31m
Final Diamond Race standings: (1) Phillips Idowu  18 points (2) Alexis Copello  9 (3) Compaoré 8
Women:
100m: Carmelita Jeter  10.78
Final Diamond Race standings: (1) Jeter 22 points (2) Veronica Campbell-Brown  10 (3) Kelly-Ann Baptiste  8
100m hurdles: Danielle Carruthers  12.65
Final Diamond Race standings: (1) Carruthers 19 points (2) Sally Pearson  & Kellie Wells  12
400m: Amantle Montsho  50.16
Final Diamond Race standings: (1) Montsho 28 points (2) Novlene Williams-Mills  7 (3) Tatyana Firova  2
1500m: Morgan Uceny  4:00.06
Final Diamond Race standings: (1) Uceny 19 points (2) Maryam Yusuf Jamal  11 (3) Anna Mishchenko  6
3000m steeplechase: Yuliya Zaripova  9:15.43
Final Diamond Race standings: (1) Milcah Chemos Cheywa  20 points (2) Sofia Assefa  10 (3) Zaripova 8
Discus throw: Li Yanfeng  66.27m
Final Diamond Race standings: (1) Yarelys Barrios  14 points (2) Li 13 (3) Nadine Müller  11
High jump: Anna Chicherova  2.05m
Final Diamond Race standings: (1) Blanka Vlašić  18 points (2) Chicherova 14 (3) Yelena Slesarenko  4
Triple jump: Olha Saladukha  14.67m
Final Diamond Race standings: (1) Saladukha 24 points (2) Olga Rypakova  6 (3) Mabel Gay  5

Australian rules football
AFL Finals Series:
Second Semi-Final in Melbourne:  19.8 (122)–13.8 (86)

Baseball
Major League Baseball news: The Detroit Tigers clinch their first American League Central title with a 3–1 win over the Oakland Athletics.

Basketball
EuroBasket in Kaunas, Lithuania (teams in bold qualify for 2012 Olympics, teams in italics qualify for World Olympic Qualifying Tournament):
Semifinals:
 92–80 
Spain reach the final for the third successive time.
 79–71 
France reach the final for the first time since 1949.
Classification 5–8:  87–77 
FIBA Asia Championship in Wuhan, China (teams in bold advance to the Second Round):
Group A:
 62–80 
 67–71 
Standings (after 2 games): South Korea 4 points, Lebanon, Malaysia 3, India 2.
Group B:
 71–81 
 4–40 
Qatar lose by default after being left with only one eligible player.
Standings (after 2 games): Iran 4 points, Chinese Taipei, Uzbekistan 3, Qatar 2.
Group C:
 61–74 
 87–92 
Standings (after 2 games): Japan 4 points, Jordan, Syria 3, Indonesia 2.
Group D:
 60–75 
 91–53 
Standings (after 2 games): China 4 points, Philippines, United Arab Emirates 3, Bahrain 2.
WNBA Playoffs:
Eastern Conference Semifinals (best-of-3 series):
Game 1 in Uncasville, Connecticut: Atlanta Dream 89, Connecticut Sun 84. Dream lead series 1–0.
Western Conference Semifinals (best-of-3 series):
Game 1 in Minneapolis: Minnesota Lynx 66, San Antonio Silver Stars 65. Lynx lead series 1–0.

Cricket
Australia in Sri Lanka:
3rd Test in Colombo, day 1:  235/5 (81.2 overs); .
India in England:
5th ODI in Cardiff:  304/6 (50 overs; Virat Kohli 107);  241/4 (32.2/34 overs). England win by 6 wickets (D/L); win 5-match series 3–0.
Pakistan in Zimbabwe:
1st T20 in Harare:  198/4 (20 overs);  113 (15.2 overs). Pakistan win by 85 runs.

Equestrianism
European Show Jumping Championship in Madrid:
Team result:   (Marco Kutscher, Carsten-Otto Nagel, Janne Friederike Meyer, Ludger Beerbaum)   (Michel Robert, Pénélope Leprevost, Kevin Staut, Olivier Guillon)   (Nick Skelton, Guy Williams, Ben Maher, John Whitaker)

Figure skating
ISU Junior Grand Prix:
JGP Baltic Cup in Gdańsk, Poland:
Pairs:  Britney Simpson/Matthew Blackmer  141.42  Katherine Bobak/Ian Beharry  132.54  Tatiana Tudvaseva/Sergei Lisiev  129.35
Standings (after 2 of 4 events): Tudvaseva/Lisiev 18 points (2 events), Sui Wenjing/Han Cong , Simpson/Blackmer 15 (1), Yu Xiaoyu/Jin Yang , Bobak/Boharry 13 (1), Margaret Purdy/Michael Marinaro  11 (1).
Ladies:  Yulia Lipnitskaya  172.51  Satoko Miyahara  162.20  Samantha Cesario  153.84
Standings (after 3 of 7 events): Lipnitskaia, Polina Shelepen , Courtney Hicks  15 points, Miyahara, Li Zijun , Risa Shoji  13.

Football (soccer)
CAF Champions League group stage Matchday 6 (teams in bold advance to the semifinals):
Group B:
MC Alger  3–1  Wydad Casablanca
Al-Ahly  1–1  Espérance ST
Final standings: Espérance ST 10 points, Wydad Casablanca, Al-Ahly 7, MC Alger 5.

Rugby league
NRL Finals Series:
Semi-Final: Wests Tigers  20–22  New Zealand Warriors
Super League Play-offs:
Qualifying Play-off: Warrington Wolves 47–0 Huddersfield Giants

Rugby union
World Cup in New Zealand:
Pool A in Hamilton:  83–7 
Standings (after 2 matches unless stated): New Zealand 10 points,  5 (1),  4 (1),  1, Japan 0.

Snooker
Brazil Masters in Florianópolis, Brazil, last 16:
Shaun Murphy  4–0 Sobradinho de Deus 
Martin Gould  1–4 Ricky Walden 
Stephen Hendry  4–1 Noel Rodrigues 
Ali Carter  4–2 Steve Davis

Tennis
Davis Cup World Group Semifinals, day 1:
 0–2 
 2–0 
Davis Cup World Group Play-offs, day 1:
 0–2 
 1–1 
 1–1 
 1–1 
 0–2 
 2–0 
 1–1 
 1–1

Volleyball
Women's NORCECA Championship in Caguas, Puerto Rico:
Semifinals:
 0–3 
 0–3 
The United States and Dominican Republic both qualify for the World Cup.
Women's Asian Championship in Taipei, Chinese Taipei (teams in bold advance to the quarterfinals):
Pool A:  0–3 
Standings: Chinese Taipei 6 points (2 matches), Iran,  0 (1).
Pool B:  1–3 
Standings:  3 points (1 match), Vietnam 3 (2), Australia 0 (1).
Pool C:
 3–1 
 3–0 
Standings (after 2 matches): China 6 points, Kazakhstan, North Korea 3, India 0.
Pool D:  3–0 
Standings: , Japan 3 points (1 match), Sri Lanka 0 (2).

Wrestling
World Championships in Istanbul, Turkey:
Women's freestyle:
67 kg:  Xi Luozhuoma   Banzragchyn Oyunsuren   Yoshiko Inoue  & Adeline Gray 
72 kg:  Stanka Zlateva   Ekaterina Bukina   Ali Bernard  & Vasilisa Marzaliuk 
Zlateva wins the title for the fifth time.
Men's freestyle 55 kg:  Viktor Lebedev   Radoslav Velikov   Daulet Niyazbekov  & Hassan Rahimi 
Lebedev wins the title for the second time.

September 15, 2011 (Thursday)

Basketball
EuroBasket in Kaunas, Lithuania:
Quarterfinals:
 64–56 
 77–67 
Classification 5–8:  77–80 
Lithuania qualifies for World Olympic Qualifying Tournament.
FIBA Asia Championship in Wuhan, China:
Group A:
 42–89 
 71–68 
Group B:
 37–49 
 12–27 
Qatar lose by default after being left with only one eligible player.
Group C:
 58–71 
 81–59 
Group D:
 92–52 
 49–101 
WNBA Playoffs:
Eastern Conference Semifinals (best-of-3 series):
Game 1 in Indianapolis: Indiana Fever 74, New York Liberty 72. Fever lead series 1–0.
Western Conference Semifinals (best-of-3 series):
Game 1 in Seattle: Seattle Storm 80, Phoenix Mercury 61. Storm lead series 1–0.

Cricket
 County Championship Division One, final round:
Durham 264 (83.4 overs) & 388 (96.1 overs); Worcestershire 288 (85.3 overs; Vikram Solanki 124) & 213 (48.4 overs). Durham win by 151 runs.
Warwickshire 493 (156.1 overs; Shivnarine Chanderpaul 171, Varun Chopra 109); Hampshire 324 (96 overs; Liam Dawson 152*) & 327/7 (f/o, 103 overs; Neil McKenzie 115*, Michael Carberry 111, Chris Metters 5/115). Match drawn.
Somerset 380 (125.4 overs; James Hildreth 186) & 310 (106.4 overs; Peter Trego 122); Lancashire 480 (126.2 overs; Murali Kartik 5/137) & 213/2 (29.1 overs). Lancashire win by 8 wickets.
Final standings: Lancashire 246 points, Warwickshire 235, Durham 232.
Lancashire win the title outright for the first time since 1934 and eighth time overall.

Football (soccer)
UEFA Europa League group stage Matchday 1:
Group A:
PAOK  0–0  Tottenham Hotspur
Shamrock Rovers  0–3  Rubin Kazan
Group B:
Hannover 96  0–0  Standard Liège
Copenhagen  1–0  Vorskla Poltava
Group C:
Hapoel Tel Aviv  0–1  Rapid București
PSV Eindhoven  1–0  Legia Warsaw
Group D:
Zürich  0–2  Sporting CP
Lazio  2–2  Vaslui
Group E:
Dynamo Kyiv  1–1  Stoke City
Beşiktaş  5–1  Maccabi Tel Aviv
Group F:
Slovan Bratislava  1–2  Athletic Bilbao
Paris Saint-Germain  3–1  Red Bull Salzburg
Group G:
AZ  4–1  Malmö FF
Austria Wien  1–2  Metalist Kharkiv
Group H:
Club Brugge  2–0  Maribor
Birmingham City  1–3  Braga
Group I:
Udinese  2–1  Rennes
Atlético Madrid  2–0  Celtic
Group J:
Maccabi Haifa  1–0  AEK Larnaca
Steaua București  0–0  Schalke 04
Group K:
Wisła Kraków  1–3  Odense
Fulham  1–1  Twente
Group L:
Sturm Graz  1–2  Lokomotiv Moscow
Anderlecht  4–1  AEK Athens
Copa Sudamericana Second stage, first leg:
Santa Fe  1–1  Deportivo Cali
Olimpia  2–1  Emelec
CONCACAF Champions League Group Stage Matchday 3:
Group A: Motagua  2–4  Alajuelense
Standings (after 3 matches):  Morelia,  Los Angeles Galaxy, Alajuelense 6 points, Motagua 0.

Rugby union
World Cup in New Zealand:
Pool C in New Plymouth:  6–13 
Standings (after 1 match unless stated):  5 points,  4, United States 4 (2), Russia 1,  0.

Snooker
Brazil Masters in Florianópolis, Brazil, last 16:
Mark Selby  4–3 Stuart Bingham 
Peter Ebdon  4–1 Stephen Lee 
Jamie Cope  2–4 Igor Figueiredo 
Graeme Dott  4–1 Mark Davis

Volleyball
Men's European Championship in Austria and Czech Republic:
Quarterfinals in Vienna, Austria:
 3–1 
 3–1 
Quarterfinals in Karlovy Vary, Czech Republic:
 0–3 
 3–1 
Women's NORCECA Championship in Caguas, Puerto Rico:
Quarterfinals:
 3–0 
 3–0 
Women's Asian Championship in Taipei, Chinese Taipei:
Pool A:  3–0 
Pool B:  0–3 
Pool C:
 3–1 
 0–3 
Pool D:  0–3

Wrestling
World Championships in Istanbul, Turkey:
Women's freestyle:
55 kg:  Saori Yoshida   Tonya Verbeek   Tetyana Lazareva  & Ida-Theres Karlsson-Nerell 
Yoshida wins the title for the ninth time.
59 kg:  Ganna Vasylenko   Sofia Mattsson   Takako Saito  & Sona Ahmadli 
63 kg:  Kaori Icho   Marianna Sastin   Ochirbatyn Nasanburmaa  & Jing Ruixue 
Icho wins the title for the seventh time.

September 14, 2011 (Wednesday)

Baseball
Major League Baseball news: The Philadelphia Phillies become the first team to clinch a playoff berth with their 1–0 win over the Houston Astros.

Basketball
EuroBasket in Kaunas, Lithuania:
Quarterfinals:
 86–64 
 67–65

Cricket
Pakistan in Zimbabwe:
3rd ODI in Harare:  270/5 (50 overs);  242/9 (50 overs). Pakistan win by 28 runs; win 3-match series 3–0.
ICC Intercontinental Cup:
In Rathmines, day 2:  462 (104.5 overs);  194 (44 overs, Albert van der Merwe 5/70) & 257 (f/o, 49 overs). Ireland win by an innings and 11 runs.
Standings (after 2 matches unless stated): Ireland 40 points,  20 (1),  17,  16,  14 (1),  7 (1),  0 (1), Canada 0.

Football (soccer)
UEFA Women's Euro 2013 qualifying:
Group 4:  0–5 
Superclásico de las Américas first leg in Córdoba, Argentina:  0–0 
UEFA Champions League group stage Matchday 1:
Group A:
Manchester City  1–1  Napoli
Villarreal  0–2  Bayern Munich
Group B:
Lille  2–2  CSKA Moscow
Internazionale  0–1  Trabzonspor
Group C:
Basel  2–1  Oțelul Galați
Benfica  1–1  Manchester United
Group D:
Dinamo Zagreb  0–1  Real Madrid
Ajax  0–0  Lyon
Copa Sudamericana Second stage, second leg (first leg score in parentheses):
Universitario  2–0 (2–1)  Deportivo Anzoátegui. Universitario win 6–0 on points.
Deportes Iquique  0–0 (1–2)  Universidad Católica. Universidad Católica win 4–1 on points.
AFC Champions League Quarter-finals first leg:
Cerezo Osaka  4–3  Jeonbuk Hyundai Motors
Suwon Samsung Bluewings  1–1  Zob Ahan
Sepahan  1–0  Al-Sadd
Al-Ittihad  3–1  FC Seoul
CONCACAF Champions League Group Stage Matchday 3:
Group C:
FC Dallas  1–1  Tauro
UNAM  4–0  Toronto FC
Standings (after 3 matches): FC Dallas 7 points, UNAM 4, Toronto FC 3, Tauro 2.
Group D:
Herediano  1–2  Seattle Sounders
Comunicaciones  1–0  Monterrey
Standings (after 3 matches): Seattle Sounders 9 points, Comunicaciones 6, Monterrey 3, Herediano 0.

Modern pentathlon
World Championships in Moscow, Russia:
Men's Relay:   (Róbert Kasza, Ádám Marosi, Péter Tibolya) 6536 points   (Choon-Huan Lee, Jin-Woo Hong, Woojin Hwang) 6492   (Pavlo Kirpulyanskyy, Pavlo Tymoshchenko, Oleksandr Mordasov) 6456

Rugby union
World Cup in New Zealand:
Pool A in Whangarei:  20–25 
Standings (after 1 match unless stated): ,  5 points, Canada 4, Tonga 1 (2),  0 (1).
Pool B in Invercargill:  15–6 
Standings (after 1 match unless stated): Scotland 9 points (2 matches),  4,  1, Georgia,  0.
Pool D in Rotorua:  49–12 
Standings (after 1 match unless stated): Samoa,  5 points,  4,  1, Namibia 0 (2).

Volleyball
Men's European Championship in Austria and Czech Republic:
Playoffs in Vienna, Austria:
 3–1 
 2–3 
Playoffs in Karlovy Vary, Czech Republic:
 3–0 
 1–3 
Women's NORCECA Championship in Caguas, Puerto Rico (teams in bold advance to the semifinals, teams in italics advance to the quarterfinals):
Pool A:  0–3 
Final standings: Puerto Rico 12 points, Mexico 6,  3.
Pool B:  0–3 
Final standings: United States 12 points,  6, Trinidad and Tobago 3.
Pool C:  3–0 
Final standings: Cuba 12 points, Dominican Republic 7,  2.

Wrestling
World Championships in Istanbul, Turkey:
Men's Greco-Roman 74 kg:  Roman Vlasov   Selçuk Çebi   Neven Žugaj  & Arsen Julfalakyan 
Women's freestyle:
48 kg:  Hitomi Sakamoto   Mariya Stadnik   Zhao Shasha  & Zhuldyz Eshimova 
Sakamoto wins her eighth world title.
51 kg:  Zamira Rakhmanova   Davaasukh Otgontsetseg   Patimat Bagomedova  & Jessica MacDonald

September 13, 2011 (Tuesday)

Cricket
ICC Intercontinental Cup:
In Rathmines, day 1:  435/7 (96 overs; Paul Stirling 107); .
ICC Intercontinental Cup One-Day:
6th ODI in Voorburg:  184/8 (50 overs);  187/6 (45 overs). Netherlands win by 4 wickets.

Football (soccer)
UEFA Champions League group stage Matchday 1:
Group E:
Chelsea  2–0  Bayer Leverkusen
Genk  0–0  Valencia
Group F:
Olympiacos  0–1  Marseille
Borussia Dortmund  1–1  Arsenal
Group G:
Porto  2–1  Shakhtar Donetsk
APOEL  2–1  Zenit St. Petersburg
Group H:
Barcelona  2–2  Milan
Viktoria Plzeň  1–1  BATE Borisov
Copa Sudamericana Second stage first leg:
Universidad de Chile  1–0  Nacional
La Equidad  0–1  Libertad
LDU Quito  4–1  Trujillanos
AFC Cup Quarter-finals first leg:
Persipura Jayapura  1–2  Arbil
Chonburi  0–1  Nasaf Qarshi
Al-Kuwait  1–0  Muangthong United
Al-Wehdat  5–1  Duhok
CONCACAF Champions League Group Stage Matchday 3:
Group A: Morelia  2–1  Los Angeles Galaxy
Standings: Morelia, Los Angeles Galaxy 6 points (3 matches),  Alajuelense 3 (2),  Motagua 0 (2).
Group B:
Real España  1–2  Isidro Metapán
Colorado Rapids  1–4  Santos Laguna
Standings (after 3 matches): Santos Laguna, Isidro Metapán 6 points, Colorado Rapids 4, Real España 1.

Modern pentathlon
World Championships in Moscow, Russia:
Women's Relay:   (Adrienn Tóth, Sarolta Kovács, Leila Gyenesei) 5726 points   (Lena Schöneborn, Eva Trautmann, Annika Schleu) 5620   (Victoria Tereshuk, Ganna Buriak, Nataliia Levchenko) 5576

Volleyball
Women's NORCECA Championship in Caguas, Puerto Rico:
Pool A:  1–3 
Standings:  6 points (1 match), Mexico 5 (1), Costa Rica 3 (2).
Pool B:  3–0 
Standings: United States 6 points (1 match), Canada 6 (2),  2 (1).
Pool C:  0–3 
Standings: Cuba,  6 points (1 match), Panama 2 (2).

Wrestling
World Championships in Istanbul, Turkey:
Men's Greco-Roman:
60 kg:  Omid Norouzi   Almat Kebispayev   Zaur Kuramagomedov  & Ivo Angelov 
84 kg:  Alim Selimau   Damian Janikowski   Nazmi Avluca  & Rami Hietaniemi 
120 kg:  Rıza Kayaalp   Mijaín López   Nurmakhan Tinaliyev  & Bashir Babajanzadeh

September 12, 2011 (Monday)

American football
NFL Monday Night Football, Week 1:
New England Patriots 38, Miami Dolphins 24
The two teams set an NFL record with 933 combined passing yards, with the Patriots' Tom Brady becoming the 11th quarterback to throw for 500 yards in a game, and the Dolphins' Chad Henne also throwing for over 400.
Oakland Raiders 23, Denver Broncos 20
As time expires in the first half, Raiders kicker Sebastian Janikowski kicks a 63-yard field goal, equaling the NFL record.

Basketball
EuroBasket in Lithuania (teams in bold advance to the quarterfinals):
Group F in Vilnius:
 67–60 
 73–60 
 63–61 
Final standings: Russia 10 points, Macedonia 9, Greece 8, Slovenia 7, Finland 6, Georgia 5.

Cricket
Australia in Sri Lanka:
2nd Test in Pallekele, day 5:   174 & 317/6 (114.3 overs);  411/7d. Match drawn; Australia lead 3-match series 1–0.
ICC Intercontinental Cup One-Day:
5th ODI in Voorburg:  208/8 (50 overs);  198/8 (42/43 overs). Netherlands win by 2 wickets (D/L).

Modern pentathlon
World Championships in Moscow, Russia:
Mixed Relay:   (Victoria Tereshuk/Dmytro Kirpulyansky)   (Evdokia Gretchichnikova/Serguei Karyakin)   (Justinas Kinderis/Laura Asadauskaitė)
Tereshuk wins her second title of the championships.

Tennis
Grand Slams:
US Open in New York City, United States, day 15:
Men's Singles Final: Novak Djokovic  [1] def. Rafael Nadal  [2] 6–2, 6–4, 6–7(3), 6–1
Djokovic wins his third Grand Slam of the year and fourth overall. This is also Djokovic's 10th title of the year and 28th of his career.

Volleyball
Men's European Championship in Austria and Czech Republic (teams in bold advance to the quarterfinals, teams in italics advance to the playoffs):
Pool A in Vienna, Austria:
 2–3 
 0–3 
Final standings: Serbia 9 points, Slovenia 5, Turkey 4, Austria 0.
Pool B in Karlovy Vary, Czech Republic:
 3–0 
 0–3 
Final standings: Russia 9 points, Czech Republic 5, Estonia 3, Portugal 1.
Pool C in Innsbruck, Austria:
 3–0 
 2–3 
Final standings: Italy 7 points, France 5, Finland, Belgium 3.
Pool D in Prague, Czech Republic:
 3–1 
 1–3 
Final standings: Slovakia 8 points, Bulgaria 7, Poland 3, Germany 0.
Women's NORCECA Championship in Caguas, Puerto Rico:
Pool A:  3–0 
Pool B:  3–1 
Pool C:  3–0

Wrestling
World Championships in Istanbul, Turkey:
Men's Greco-Roman:
55 kg:  Rovshan Bayramov   Elbek Tazhyieu   Li Shujin  & Bekkhan Mankiev 
66 kg:  Saeid Abdevali   Manuchar Tskhadaia   Kim Hyeon-Woo  & Pedro Isaac 
96 kg:  Elis Guri   Jimmy Lidberg   Rustam Totrov  & Cenk İldem

September 11, 2011 (Sunday)

American football
NFL Week 1:
Houston Texans 34, Indianapolis Colts 7
Baltimore Ravens 35, Pittsburgh Steelers 7
Buffalo Bills 41, Kansas City Chiefs 7
Jacksonville Jaguars 16, Tennessee Titans 14
Chicago Bears 30, Atlanta Falcons 12
Philadelphia Eagles 31, St. Louis Rams 13
Detroit Lions 27, Tampa Bay Buccaneers 20
Cincinnati Bengals 27, Cleveland Browns 17
San Diego Chargers 24, Minnesota Vikings 17
Washington Redskins 28, New York Giants 14
Arizona Cardinals 28, Carolina Panthers 21
Panthers quarterback Cam Newton ties Matthew Stafford's single-game rookie record of 422 passing yards in his first NFL game.
San Francisco 49ers 33, Seattle Seahawks 17
Sunday Night Football: New York Jets 27, Dallas Cowboys 24

Australian rules football
AFL Finals Series:
First Elimination Final in Melbourne:  21.23 (149)–13.9 (87)

Auto racing
Formula One:
 in Monza, Italy: (1) Sebastian Vettel  (Red Bull-Renault) (2) Jenson Button  (McLaren-Mercedes) (3) Fernando Alonso  (Ferrari)
Drivers' championship standings (after 13 of 19 races): (1) Vettel 284 points (2) Alonso 172 (3) Button & Mark Webber  (Red Bull-Renault) 167
World Rally Championship:
Rally Australia in Coffs Harbour, Australia: (1) Mikko Hirvonen /Jarmo Lehtinen  (Ford Fiesta RS WRC) (2) Jari-Matti Latvala /Miikka Anttila  (Ford Fiesta RS WRC) (3) Petter Solberg /Chris Patterson  (Citroën DS3 WRC)
Drivers' championship standings (after 10 of 13 rallies): (1) Sébastien Loeb  (Citroën DS3 WRC) 196 points (2) Hirvonen 181 (3) Sébastien Ogier  (Citroën DS3 WRC) 167

Basketball
EuroBasket in Lithuania (teams in bold advance to the quarterfinals):
Group E in Vilnius:
 68–67 
 69–96 
 84–75 
Final standings: Spain, France 9 points, Lithuania 8, Serbia 7, Germany, Turkey 6.
FIBA Americas Championship in Mar del Plata, Argentina:
Bronze medal game:   103–89 
Final:   75–80  
Argentina win the title for the second time.
FIBA Oceania Championship:
Game 3 in Sydney:  92–68 . Australia win 3-game series 3–0.
Australia win the title for the 17th time.
FIBA Oceania Championship for Women:
Game 3 in Sydney:  82–57 . Australia win 3-game series 3–0.
Australia win the title for the eighth successive time, and 13th time overall.

Canoeing
Slalom World Championships in Bratislava, Slovakia:
Men:
Individual single kayak (K1M):  Peter Kauzer  96.01  Mateusz Polaczyk  97.22  Fabien Lefèvre  98.89
Kauzer wins the event for the second time.
Individual single canoe (C1M):  Denis Gargaud Chanut  101.14  Nico Bettge  103.83  Matej Beňuš  103.91
Team double canoe (C2M):   127.27   127.94   129.51
Team single kayak (K1M):   110.79   111.83   112.44
Team single canoe (C1M):   109.97   114.95   115.74
Women:
Individual single Canoe (C1W):  Kateřina Hošková  138.58  Cen Nanqin  140.13  Katarína Macová  140.24
Team single kayak (K1W):   131.90   132.25   134.77
Team single canoe (C1W):   179.44   194.69   230.51

Cricket
Australia in Sri Lanka:
2nd Test in Pallekele, day 4:  174 & 223/2 (79 overs);  411/7d. Sri Lanka trail by 14 runs with 8 wickets remaining.
India in England:
4th ODI in London:  280/5 (50 overs);  270/8 (48.5 overs). Match tied (D/L); England lead 5-match series 2–0.
Pakistan in Zimbabwe:
2nd ODI in Harare:  225/6 (50 overs);  228/0 (42.1 overs; Mohammad Hafeez 139*). Pakistan win by 10 wickets; lead 3-match series 2–0.

Cycling
Grand Tours:
Vuelta a España, Stage 21:  Peter Sagan  2h 20' 59"  Daniele Bennati  s.t.  Alessandro Petacchi  s.t.
Final general classification: (1) Juan José Cobo   84h 59' 31" (2) Chris Froome  + 13" (3) Bradley Wiggins  + 1' 39"
UCI World Tour:
GP de Montréal:  Rui Costa  5h 20' 18"  Pierrick Fédrigo  s.t.  Philippe Gilbert  + 2"
UCI World Tour standings (after 25 of 27 races): (1) Gilbert 698 points (2) Cadel Evans  574 (3) Alberto Contador  471

Equestrianism
Show jumping:
Spruce Meadows Masters in Calgary (CSIO 5*):
CN International Grand Prix:  Eric Lamaze  on Hickstead  Niels Bruynseels  on Nasa  Martin Fuchs  on Principal 12
HITS-on-the-Hudson Horse Show in Saugerties, New York:
Pfizer $1m Grand Prix:  Andre Thieme  on Aragon Rouet  Duncan McFarlane  on Mr Whoopy  McLain Ward  on Antares F

Field hockey
African Olympic Qualifier in Bulawayo, Zimbabwe:
Men's Final:  1–0 
Women's Final:  5–0 
South Africa qualify both men and women teams for 2012 Olympics.

Football (soccer)
2012 Olympics Women's Asian Qualifiers Final Round in Jinan, China (teams in bold qualify for 2012 Olympics):
 0–5 
 1–2 
 1–0 
Final standings: Japan 13 points, North Korea 11, Australia 9, China PR 5, South Korea 4, Thailand 0.
2012 CAF Women's Pre-Olympic Tournament Final Round second leg (first leg score in parentheses):  1–1 (0–3) . South Africa win 4–1 on aggregate, and qualify for 2012 Olympics.
FIFA Beach Soccer World Cup in Ravenna, Italy:
Bronze medal match:  2–3  
Final:   12–8  
Russia win the title for the first time.
CAF Champions League Group stage Matchday 5:
Group B: Wydad Casablanca  1–1  Al-Ahly
Standings (after 5 matches):  Espérance ST 9 points, Wydad Casablanca 7, Al-Ahly 6,  MC Alger 2.
CAF Confederation Cup Group stage Matchday 5 (team in bold advances to the semifinals):
Group A:
Inter Luanda  4–1  Kaduna United
Club Africain  1–0  ASEC Mimosas
Standings (after 5 matches): Inter Luanda 10 points, Club Africain 8, Kaduna United 5, ASEC Mimosas 4.
Group B: Motema Pembe  0–0  Sunshine Stars
Standings (after 5 matches):  Maghreb de Fès 11 points, Motema Pembe, Sunshine Stars 8,  JS Kabylie 0.

Golf
European Tour:
KLM Open in Hilversum, Netherlands:
Winner: Simon Dyson  268 (−12)
Dyson wins the title for the third time, for his sixth European Tour title.
LPGA Tour:
Walmart NW Arkansas Championship in Rogers, Arkansas:
Winner: Yani Tseng  201 (−12)PO
Tseng defeats Amy Yang  on the first playoff hole, to win her fifth LPGA Tour title of the year and tenth of her career.
Amateur events:
Walker Cup in Aberdeen, Scotland: Great Britain & Ireland  14–12  United States
Great Britain & Ireland win the Cup for the first time since 2003, and eighth time overall.

Modern pentathlon
World Championships in Moscow, Russia:
Men's Individual:  Andrey Moiseyev  5964 points  Aleksander Lesun  5944  Ádám Marosi  5924
Men's team:   (Lesun, Ilia Frolov, Serguei Karyakin) 17,588 points   (Marosi, Róbert Kasza, Bence Demeter) 17,560   (Riccardo De Luca, Auro Franceschini, Nicola Benedetti) 16,956

Open water swimming
European Championships in Eilat, Israel:
Women's 25 km:  Alice Franco  5:26:23.6  Margarita Dominguez  5:26:42.7  Jana Pechanová  5:26:44.2
Men's 25 km:  Brian Ryckeman  5:05:02.2  Petar Stoychev  5:05:06.6  Joanes Hedel  5:05:18.3

Rugby league
NRL Finals Series:
Qualifying Final: Melbourne Storm  18–8  Newcastle Knights

Rugby union
World Cup in New Zealand:
Pool C:
In Auckland:  32–6 
In New Plymouth:  22–10 
Pool D in Wellington:  17–16

Snooker
Shanghai Masters in Shanghai, China:
Final: Mark Selby  10–9 Mark Williams 
Selby wins his second ranking title, and seventh professional title.

Tennis
Grand Slams:
US Open in New York City, United States, day 14:
Women's Singles Final: Samantha Stosur  [9] def. Serena Williams  [28] 6–2, 6–3
Stosur, in winning her third career singles title, becomes the first Australian woman to win a Grand Slam singles event since Evonne Goolagong won Wimbledon in 1980.
Women's Doubles Final: Liezel Huber /Lisa Raymond  [4] def. Vania King /Yaroslava Shvedova  [3] 4–6, 7–6(5), 7–6(3)
Huber and Raymond win their first Grand Slam title as a team. Huber wins her second US Open and fifth Grand Slam overall. Raymond wins her third US Open and sixth Grand Slam title overall.

Triathlon
ITU World Championships:
Grand Final in Beijing, China:
Women:  Andrea Hewitt  1:58:27  Helen Jenkins  1:58:38  Melanie Annaheim  1:58:58
Final standings: (1) Jenkins 4032 points (2) Hewitt 3836 (3) Sarah Groff  2783
Jenkins wins the title for the second time.

Volleyball
Men's European Championship in Austria and Czech Republic:
Pool A in Vienna, Austria:
 1–3 
 0–3 
Standings (after 2 matches): Serbia 6 points, Slovenia, Turkey 3, Austria 0.
Pool B in Karlovy Vary, Czech Republic:
 1–3 
 3–0 
Standings (after 2 matches): Russia 6 points, Czech Republic 5, Portugal 1, Estonia 0.
Pool C in Innsbruck, Austria:
 3–1 
 3–0 
Standings (after 2 matches): Italy 6 points, France, Belgium 3, Finland 0.
Pool D in Prague, Czech Republic:
 1–3 
 1–3 
Standings (after 2 matches): Slovakia 5 points, Bulgaria 4, Poland 3, Germany 0.

September 10, 2011 (Saturday)

American football
NCAA AP Top 10:
(2) LSU 49, Northwestern State 3
(3) Alabama 27, (23) Penn State 11
(5) Florida State 62, Charleston Southern 10
(6) Stanford 44, Duke 14
(8) Wisconsin 35, Oregon State 0
(10) Nebraska 42, Fresno State 29
Idle: (1) Oklahoma, (4) Boise State, (7) Texas A&M
Other games: Auburn 41, (16) Mississippi State 34

Australian rules football
AFL Finals Series:
First Qualifying Final in Melbourne:  12.10 (82)–9.8 (62) 
Second Elimination Final in Melbourne:  8.9 (57)–12.10 (82)

Auto racing
Sprint Cup Series:
Wonderful Pistachios 400 in Richmond, Virginia: (1)  Kevin Harvick (Chevrolet; Richard Childress Racing) (2)  Carl Edwards (Ford; Roush Fenway Racing) (3)  Jeff Gordon (Chevrolet; Hendrick Motorsports)
Drivers qualifying for the Chase for the Sprint Cup (points through 26 races, followed by points entering the Chase in parentheses):  Kyle Busch (Toyota; Joe Gibbs Racing) 2012 points (891), Harvick 2012 (867), Gordon 2009 (872),  Matt Kenseth (Ford, Roush Fenway Racing) 2006 (856), Edwards 2003 (878),  Jimmie Johnson (Chevrolet; Hendrick Motorsports) 2003 (887),  Kurt Busch (Dodge; Penske Racing) 2003 (839),  Ryan Newman (Chevrolet; Stewart Haas Racing) 2003 (822),  Tony Stewart (Chevrolet; Stewart Haas Racing) 2000 (788),  Dale Earnhardt Jr. (Chevrolet; Hendrick Motorsports) 2000 (781),  Brad Keselowski (Dodge; Penske Racing) 2000 (760) (wild card),  Denny Hamlin (Toyota; Joe Gibbs Racing) 2000 (744) (wild card).

Basketball
EuroBasket in Lithuania (teams in bold advance to the quarterfinals):
Group F in Vilnius:
 73–87 
 68–59 
 67–83 
Standings (after 4 games): Russia, Macedonia 8 points, Greece 6, Slovenia, Finland 5, Georgia 4.
FIBA Americas Championship in Mar del Plata, Argentina:
Semifinals:
 83–76 
 81–79 
Brazil and Argentina qualify for 2012 Olympics.
Dominican Republic, Puerto Rico and  qualify for World Olympic Qualifying Tournament.

Canoeing
Slalom World Championships in Bratislava, Slovakia:
Men's individual double canoe (C2M):  Pavol Hochschorner/Peter Hochschorner  106.76  Fabien Lefèvre/Denis Gargaud Chanut  107.49  Ladislav Škantár/Peter Škantár  109.86
The Hochschorner twins win the event for the fifth time and their sixth world title overall.
Women's individual single kayak (K1W):  Corinna Kuhnle  110.05  Jana Dukátová  113.33  Maialen Chourraut  113.58
Kuhnle wins the event for the second successive time.

Cricket
Australia in Sri Lanka:
2nd Test in Pallekele, day 3:  174;  411/7 (132 overs; Michael Hussey 142, Shaun Marsh 141). Australia lead by 237 runs with 3 wickets remaining in the 1st innings.
ICC Intercontinental Cup:
In Deventer, day 4:  vs. . Match abandoned without a ball bowled.
Standings (after 1 match unless stated): ,  20 points, Netherlands 17 (2), Kenya 16 (2),  14,  7,  0.

Cycling
Grand Tours:
Vuelta a España, Stage 20 (all ITA):  Daniele Bennati 4h 39' 20"  Enrico Gasparotto s.t.  Damiano Caruso s.t.
General classification (after stage 20): (1) Juan José Cobo   82h 38' 32" (2) Chris Froome  + 13" (3) Bradley Wiggins  + 1' 39"

Equestrianism
Show jumping – Nations Cup Promotional League North and South America (2012):
Nations Cup of Canada in Calgary, Canada (CSIO 5*):   (Jerome Hurel, Marc Dilasser, Roger-Yves Bost)   (Jonathan Asselin, Tiffany Foster, Ian Millar, Eric Lamaze)   (Martin Fuchs, Marc Örtly, Simone Wettstein, Christina Liebherr)

Figure skating
ISU Junior Grand Prix:
JGP Brisbane in Brisbane, Australia:
Ice dancing:  Nicole Orford/Thomas Williams  127.21 points  Lauri Bonacorsi/Travis Mager  123.62  Valeria Zenkova/Valerie Sinitsin  122.35
Standings (after 2 of 7 events): Orford/Williams, Maria Nosulia/Evgen Kholoniuk  15 points, Bonacorsi/Mager, Evgenia Kosigina/Nikolai Moroshkin  13, Zenkova/Sinitsin, Alexandra Aldridge/Daniel Eaton  11.
Men:  Jason Brown  197.23 points  Keiji Tanaka  192.36  Liam Firus  180.00
Standings (after 2 of 7 events): Brown, Ryuju Hino  15 points, Tananka, Zhang He  13, Firus, Timothy Dolensky  11.

Football (soccer)
FIFA Beach Soccer World Cup in Ravenna, Italy:
Semi finals:
 3–7 
 4–1 
CAF Champions League Group stage Matchday 5 (team in bold advances to the semifinals):
Group A: Coton Sport  2–1  Raja Casablanca
Standings (after 5 matches):  Enyimba 11 points, Coton Sport,  Al-Hilal 7, Raja Casablanca 2.
Group B: Espérance ST  4–0  MC Alger
Standings: Espérance ST 9 points (5 matches),  Wydad Casablanca 6 (4),  Al-Ahly 5 (4), MC Alger 2 (5).
CAF Confederation Cup Group stage Matchday 5:
Group B: JS Kabylie  0–1  Maghreb de Fès
Standings: Maghreb de Fès 11 points (5 matches),  Motema Pembe,  Sunshine Stars 7 (4), JS Kabylie 0 (5).

Horse racing
English Thoroughbred Triple Crown:
St. Leger Stakes in Doncaster:  Masked Marvel (trainer: John Gosden, jockey: William Buick)  Brown Panther (trainer: Tom Dascombe, jockey: Kieren Fallon)  Sea Moon (trainer: Michael Stoute, jockey: Olivier Peslier)

Mixed martial arts
Strikeforce World Grand Prix: Barnett vs. Kharitonov in Cincinnati, Ohio, United States:
Heavyweight Grand Prix Semifinal bout: Josh Barnett  def. Sergei Kharitonov  via submission (arm triangle choke)
Heavyweight Grand Prix Semifinal bout: Daniel Cormier  def. Antônio Silva  via KO (punches)
Middleweight Championship bout: Luke Rockhold  def. Ronaldo Souza  (c) via unanimous decision (50–45, 48–47, 48–47)
Light Heavyweight bout: Muhammed Lawal  def. Roger Gracie  via KO (punch)
Lightweight bout: Pat Healy  def. Maximo Blanco  via submission (rear naked choke)

Modern pentathlon
World Championships in Moscow, Russia:
Women's Individual:  Victoria Tereshuk  5544 points  Sarolta Kovács  5512  Laura Asadauskaitė  5504
Women's team:   (Lena Schöneborn, Annika Schleu, Eva Trautmann)   (Leila Gyenesei, Kovács, Adrienn Tóth)   (Jevdokija Grecsisnyikova, Julija Kolegova, Jekatyerina Huraszkina)

Open water swimming
European Championships in Eilat, Israel:
Women's 5 km:  Rachele Bruni  55:51.0  Jana Pechanová  57:06.0  Coralie Codevelle  57:16.7
Men's 5 km:  Simone Ercoli  53:34.9  Jan Wolfgarten  53:39.0  Michael Dmitriev  54:03.5
Bruni and Ercoli both win their second title of the championships.

Rugby league
NRL Finals Series:
Qualifying Finals:
Brisbane Broncos  40–10  New Zealand Warriors
Manly-Warringah Sea Eagles  42–8  North Queensland Cowboys

Rugby union
World Cup in New Zealand:
Pool A in Auckland:  47–21 
Pool B:
In Invercargill:  34–24 
In Dunedin:  9–13 
Pool D in Rotorua:  49–25

Snooker
Shanghai Masters in Shanghai, China, semi-finals:
Mark King  0–6 Mark Selby 
Mark Williams  6–5 Neil Robertson

Tennis
Grand Slams:
US Open in New York City, United States, day 13:
Men's Singles, semifinals:
Novak Djokovic  [1] def. Roger Federer  [3] 6–7(7), 4–6, 6–3, 6–2, 7–5
Djokovic reaches his third US Open final, and sixth Grand Slam final overall.
Federer fails to win a Grand Slam in a year for the first time since 2002.
Rafael Nadal  [2] def. Andy Murray  [4] 6–4, 6–2, 3–6, 6–2
Nadal reaches his second consecutive US Open final, and 14th Grand Slam final overall.
Women's Singles, semifinals:
Serena Williams  [28] def. Caroline Wozniacki  [1] 6–2, 6–4
Williams reaches her fifth US Open final, and 17th Grand Slam final overall.
Samantha Stosur  [9] def. Angelique Kerber  6–3, 2–6, 6–2
Stosur reaches her second Grand Slam final.
Men's Doubles Final: Jürgen Melzer /Philipp Petzschner  [9] def. Mariusz Fyrstenberg /Marcin Matkowski  [6] 6–2, 6–2
Melzer and Petzschner win their second Grand Slam title.

Triathlon
ITU World Championships:
Grand Final in Beijing, China:
Men:  Alistair Brownlee  1:48:07  Sven Riederer  1:48:15  Jonathan Brownlee  1:48:18
Final standings: (1) Alistair Brownlee 4285 points (2) Jonathan Brownlee 3992 (3) Javier Gómez  3671
Brownlee wins the title for the second time.

Volleyball
Men's European Championship in Austria and Czech Republic:
Pool A in Vienna, Austria:
 3–0 
 3–0 
Pool B in Karlovy Vary, Czech Republic:
 3–0 
 2–3 
Pool C in Innsbruck, Austria:
 3–1 
 1–3 
Pool D in Prague, Czech Republic:
 3–2 
 1–3

September 9, 2011 (Friday)

American football
NCAA AP Top 25: Arizona State 37, (21) Missouri 30 (OT)

Australian rules football
AFL Finals Series:
Second Qualifying Final in Melbourne:  14.14 (98)–9.13 (67)

Auto racing
Nationwide Series:
Virginia 529 College Savings 250 in Richmond, Virginia: (1)  Kyle Busch (Toyota; Joe Gibbs Racing) (2)  Carl Edwards (Ford; Roush Fenway Racing) (3)  Ricky Stenhouse Jr. (Ford; Roush Fenway Racing)
Drivers' championship standings (after 27 of 34 races): (1) Stenhouse Jr. 950 points (2)  Elliott Sadler (Chevrolet; Kevin Harvick Incorporated) 934 (3)  Reed Sorenson (Chevrolet; Turner Motorsports) 905

Basketball
EuroBasket in Lithuania (teams in bold advance to the quarterfinals):
Group E in Vilnius:
 84–59 
 73–67 
 67–73 
Standings (after 4 games): France 8 points, Spain 7, Lithuania 6, Turkey, Serbia, Germany 5.
FIBA Oceania Championship:
Game 2 in Brisbane:  81–64 . Australia lead 3-game series 2–0.
FIBA Oceania Championship for Women:
Game 2 in Brisbane:  92–73 . Australia lead 3-game series 2–0.
Australia's men and women teams both qualify for 2012 Olympics.
New Zealand's teams qualify for World Olympic Qualifying Tournament.

Cricket
Australia in Sri Lanka:
2nd Test in Pallekele, day 2:  174 (64.1 overs);  264/3 (91.3 overs). Australia lead by 90 runs with 7 wickets remaining in the 1st innings.
India in England:
3rd ODI in London:  234/7 (50 overs);  218/7 (41.5/43 overs). England win by 3 wickets (D/L); lead 5-match series 2–0.
ICC Intercontinental Cup:
In Belfast, day 4:  244 & 226;  298 & 176/5 (40.2 overs). Ireland win by 5 wickets.
In Deventer, day 3:  vs. . No play due to rain.

Cycling
Grand Tours:
Vuelta a España, Stage 19:  Igor Antón  3h 53' 34"  Marzio Bruseghin  + 41"  Dominik Nerz  + 1' 30"
General classification (after stage 19): (1) Juan José Cobo   77h 59' 12" (2) Chris Froome  + 13" (3) Bradley Wiggins  + 1' 41"
UCI World Tour:
GP de Québec:  Philippe Gilbert  5h 03' 08"  Robert Gesink  s.t.  Rigoberto Urán  + 9"
UCI World Tour standings (after 23 of 27 races): (1) Gilbert 648 points (2) Cadel Evans  574 (3) Alberto Contador  471

Figure skating
ISU Junior Grand Prix:
JGP Brisbane in Brisbane, Australia:
Ladies:  Courtney Hicks  151.91 points  Risa Shoji  147.49  Vanessa Lam  145.48
Standings (after 2 of 7 events): Polina Shelepen , Hicks 15 points, Li Zijun , Shoji 13, Lam, Polina Agafonova  11.

Football (soccer)
CAF Champions League Group stage Matchday 5 (teams in bold advance to the semifinals):
Group A: Al-Hilal  1–2  Enyimba
Standings: Enyimba 11 points (5 matches), Al-Hilal 7 (5),  Coton Sport 4 (4),  Raja Casablanca 2 (4).

Rugby league
NRL Finals Series:
Qualifying Final: Wests Tigers  21–12  St. George Illawarra Dragons

Rugby union
World Cup in New Zealand:
Pool A in Auckland:  41–10

Snooker
Shanghai Masters in Shanghai, China, quarter-finals:
Shaun Murphy  4–5 Mark Selby 
Mark King  5–2 Anthony Hamilton 
Mark Williams  5–0 Matthew Stevens 
Neil Robertson  5–2 John Higgins

Surfing
Men's World Tour:
Quiksilver Pro New York in Long Island, New York, United States: (1) Owen Wright  (2) Kelly Slater  (3) Taj Burrow  & Alejo Muniz 
Standings (after 6 of 11 events): (1) Slater 34,950 points (2) Wright 31,900 (3) Joel Parkinson  30,200

Tennis
Grand Slams:
US Open in New York City, United States, day 12:
Men's Singles, quarterfinals:
Rafael Nadal  [2] def. Andy Roddick  [21] 6–2, 6–1, 6–3
Andy Murray  [4] def. John Isner  [28] 7–5, 6–4, 3–6, 7–6(2)
Mixed Doubles Final: Melanie Oudin /Jack Sock  def. Gisela Dulko /Eduardo Schwank  [8] 7–6(4), 4–6, [10–8]
Oudin and Sock both win their first Grand Slam title.

September 8, 2011 (Thursday)

American football
NFL Week 1:
NFL Kickoff Game: Green Bay Packers 42, New Orleans Saints 34
NCAA AP Top 10: (9) Oklahoma State 37, Arizona 14

Athletics
IAAF Diamond League:
Weltklasse Zürich in Zürich, Switzerland:
Men:
100m: Yohan Blake  9.82
Final Diamond Race standings: (1) Asafa Powell  18 points (2) Blake 8 (3) Nesta Carter  4
110m hurdles: Dayron Robles  13.01
Final Diamond Race standings: (1) Robles 16 points (2) David Oliver  13 (3) Jason Richardson  10
400m: Kirani James  44.36
Final Diamond Race standings: (1) James 12 points (2) Jermaine Gonzales  11 (3) Chris Brown  & LaShawn Merritt  6
1500m: Nixon Chepseba  3:32.74
Final Diamond Race standings: (1) Chepseba 12 points (2) Asbel Kiprop  11 (3) Silas Kiplagat  10
3000m steeplechase: Ezekiel Kemboi  8:07.72
Final Diamond Race standings: (1) Paul Kipsiele Koech  17 points (2) Kemboi 16 (3) Benjamin Kiplagat  5
4 × 100 m relay:  (Lerone Clarke, Carter, Ainsley Waugh, Michael Frater) 38.31
Discus throw: Robert Harting  67.02m
Final Diamond Race standings: (1) Virgilijus Alekna  17 points (2) Harting 16 (3) Gerd Kanter  9
High jump: Dimitrios Chondrokoukis  2.32m
Final Diamond Race standings: (1) Andrey Silnov  & Jesse Williams  9 points (3) Hondrokoúkis 8
Long jump: Ngonidzashe Makusha  8.00m
Final Diamond Race standings: (1) Mitchell Watt  12 points (2) Mukisha 8 (3) Aleksandr Menkov  4
Women:
100m hurdles: Sally Pearson  12.52
200m: Carmelita Jeter  22.27
Final Diamond Race standings: (1) Jeter 13 points (2) Allyson Felix  & Bianca Knight  10
400m hurdles: Kaliese Spencer  53.36
Final Diamond Race standings: (1) Spencer 24 points (2) Melaine Walker  10 (3) Zuzana Hejnová  & Lashinda Demus  8
800m: Mariya Savinova  1:58.27
Final Diamond Race standings: (1) Jenny Meadows  11 points (2) Savinova & Kenia Sinclair  10
5000m: Vivian Cheruiyot  14:30.10
Final Diamond Race standings: (1) Cheruiyot 20 points (2) Sally Kipyego  & Sentayehu Ejigu  6
Javelin throw: Christina Obergföll  69.57m
Final Diamond Race standings: (1) Obergföll 28 points (2) Barbora Špotáková  10 (3) Mariya Abakumova  9
Long jump: Brittney Reese  6.72m
Final Diamond Race standings: (1) Reese 23 points (2) Funmi Jimoh  10 (3) Janay DeLoach  6
Pole vault: Jenn Suhr  4.72m
Final Diamond Race standings: (1) Silke Spiegelburg  14 points (2) Suhr 13 (3) Fabiana Murer  10

Basketball
EuroBasket in Lithuania (teams in bold advance to the quarterfinals):
Group F in Vilnius:
 63–65 
 60–79 
 60–69 
Standings (after 3 games): Russia, Macedonia 6 points, Greece 5, Slovenia 4, Georgia, Finland 3.
FIBA Americas Championship in Mar del Plata, Argentina (teams in bold advance to the semifinals, team in italics qualifies for World Olympic Qualifying Tournament):
Second round:
 91–89 
 80–92 
 84–58 
 72–94 
Final standings: Brazil, Argentina 13 points, Puerto Rico 12, Dominican Republic 11, Venezuela 10, Canada 9, Uruguay, Panama 8.

Cricket
Australia in Sri Lanka:
2nd Test in Pallekele, day 1:  174 (64.1 overs);  60/0 (17.4 overs). Australia trail by 114 runs with 10 wickets remaining in the 1st innings.
Pakistan in Zimbabwe:
1st ODI in Bulawayo:  247/7 (50 overs);  242/7 (50 overs). Pakistan win by 5 runs; lead 3-match series 1–0.
ICC Intercontinental Cup:
In Belfast, day 3:  244 & 226 (79.3 overs);  298 & 135/4 (32 overs). Ireland require another 38 runs with 6 wickets remaining.
In Deventer, day 2:  vs. . No play due to rain.

Cycling
Grand Tours:
Vuelta a España, Stage 18:  Francesco Gavazzi  4h 24' 42"  Kristof Vandewalle  s.t.  Alexandre Geniez  + 10"
General classification (after stage 18): (1) Juan José Cobo   74h 04' 05" (2) Chris Froome  + 13" (3) Bradley Wiggins  + 1' 41"

Football (soccer)
2012 Olympics Women's Asian Qualifiers Final Round in Jinan, China (team in bold qualifies for 2012 Olympics):
 0–3 
 1–1 
 1–0 
Standings (after 4 matches): Japan 10 points, North Korea 8, Australia 6, China PR 5, South Korea 4, Thailand 0.
FIFA Beach Soccer World Cup in Ravenna, Italy:
Quarter finals:
 5–3 
 4–4 (3–2 pen.) 
 5–6 (a.e.t.) 
 10–8 (a.e.t.) 
Copa Sudamericana Second stage:
First leg: Universidad Católica  2–1  Deportes Iquique
Second leg (first leg score in parentheses): Vélez Sársfield  4–0 (0–0)  Argentinos Juniors. Vélez Sársfield win 4–1 on points.

Open water swimming
European Championships in Eilat, Israel:
5 km team event:   (Simone Ercoli, Luca Ferretti, Rachele Bruni) 56:12.4   (Hendrik Rijkens, Rob Mufels, Svenja Zihsler) 57:15.2   (Sebastien Fraysse, Damien Cattin Vidal, Coralie Codevelle) 57:41.1

Snooker
Shanghai Masters in Shanghai, China, last 16:
Jamie Cope  0–5 Mark Selby 
Mark Williams  5–1 Robert Milkins 
Stuart Bingham  2–5 John Higgins 
Mark King  5–3 Fergal O'Brien 
Ronnie O'Sullivan  3–5 Anthony Hamilton 
Matthew Stevens  5–1 Martin Gould 
Shaun Murphy  5–4 Mark Allen 
Neil Robertson  5–2 Michael Holt

Tennis
Grand Slams:
US Open in New York City, United States, day 11:
Men's Singles, fourth round:
Rafael Nadal  [2] def. Gilles Müller  7–6(1), 6–1, 6–2
Andy Murray  [4] def. Donald Young  6–2, 6–3, 6–3
Andy Roddick  [21] def. David Ferrer  [5] 6–3, 6–4, 3–6, 6–3
John Isner  [28] def. Gilles Simon  [12] 7–6(2), 3–6, 7–6(2), 7–6(4)
Men's Singles, quarterfinals:
Novak Djokovic  [1] def. Janko Tipsarević  [20] 7–6(2), 6–7(3), 6–0, 3–0 retired
Roger Federer  [3] def. Jo-Wilfried Tsonga  [11] 6–4, 6–3, 6–3
Women's Singles, quarterfinals:
Caroline Wozniacki  [1] def. Andrea Petkovic  [10] 6–1, 7–6(5)
Samantha Stosur  [9] def. Vera Zvonareva  [2] 6–3, 6–3
Serena Williams  [28] def. Anastasia Pavlyuchenkova  [17] 7–5, 6–1
Angelique Kerber  def. Flavia Pennetta  [26] 6–4, 4–6, 6–3

September 7, 2011 (Wednesday)

Athletics
IAAF Diamond League:
Weltklasse Zürich in Zürich, Switzerland:
Men's shot put: Dylan Armstrong  21.63m
Women's shot put: Valerie Adams  20.51m
Final Diamond Race standings: (1) Adams 24 points (2) Nadzeya Astapchuk  16 (3) Jillian Camarena-Williams  8

Basketball
EuroBasket in Lithuania (team in bold advances to the quarterfinals):
Group E in Vilnius:
 68–77 
 64–68 
 90–100 
Standings (after 3 games): France 6 points, Spain, Lithuania 5, Serbia, Turkey 4, Germany 3.
FIBA Americas Championship in Mar del Plata, Argentina (teams in bold advance to the semifinals):
Second round:
 70–68 
 110–74 
 73–71 
 62–79 
Standings (after 6 games): Argentina, Brazil, Puerto Rico 11 points, Dominican Republic 10, Venezuela, Canada 8, Uruguay 7, Panama 6.
FIBA Oceania Championship:
Game 1 in Melbourne:  91–78 . Australia lead 3-game series 1–0.
FIBA Oceania Championship for Women:
Game 1 in Melbourne:  77–64 . Australia lead 3-game series 1–0.

Cricket
ICC Intercontinental Cup:
In Belfast, day 2:  244 & 58/1 (20 overs);  298 (83.5 overs; Andrew White 123*, Christi Viljoen 5/87). Namibia lead by 4 runs with 9 wickets remaining.
In Deventer, day 1:  vs. . No play due to rain.

Cycling
Grand Tours:
Vuelta a España, Stage 17:  Chris Froome  4h 52' 38"  Juan José Cobo   + 1"  Bauke Mollema  + 21"
General classification (after stage 17): (1) Cobo  69h 31' 41" (2) Froome + 13" (3) Bradley Wiggins  + 1' 41"

Football (soccer)
Copa Sudamericana Second stage, second leg (first leg score in parentheses): Godoy Cruz  0–0 (2–2)  Lanús. 3–3 on points, 2–2 on aggregate; Godoy Cruz win on away goals.

Open water swimming
European Championships in Eilat, Israel:
Women's 10 km:  Martina Grimaldi  2:00:18.6  Rachele Bruni  2:00:19.2  Nadine Reichert  2:00:20.0
Men's 10 km:  Thomas Lurz  1:53:18.2  Vladimir Dyatchin  1:53:20.0  Igor Snitko  1:53:21.5

Snooker
Shanghai Masters in Shanghai, China, last 32:
Mark Williams  5–0 Andrew Higginson 
Judd Trump  1–5 Stuart Bingham 
John Higgins  5–2 Mark Davis 
Graeme Dott  2–5 Michael Holt 
Stephen Hendry  1–5 Robert Milkins 
Matthew Stevens  5–2 Stephen Lee 
Ding Junhui  3–5 Martin Gould 
Neil Robertson  5–1 Liang Wenbo

Tennis
Grand Slams:
US Open in New York City, United States, day 10:
Men's Singles, fourth round (all matches suspended):
Gilles Müller  vs. Rafael Nadal  [2] 3–0
Donald Young  vs. Andy Murray  [4] 2–1
David Ferrer  [5] vs. Andy Roddick  [21] 1–3

September 6, 2011 (Tuesday)

Auto racing
Sprint Cup Series:
AdvoCare 500 in Hampton, Georgia: (1)  Jeff Gordon (Chevrolet; Hendrick Motorsports) (2)  Jimmie Johnson (Chevrolet; Hendrick Motorsports) (3)  Tony Stewart (Chevrolet; Stewart Haas Racing)
Gordon wins his 85th race in the series, moving into third place on the all-time wins list, ahead of Bobby Allison and Darrell Waltrip, and also surpassing Waltrip for the most wins in NASCAR's modern era.
Drivers' championship standings (after 25 of 36 races): (1) Johnson 873 points (2)  Kyle Busch (Toyota; Joe Gibbs Racing) 852 (3)  Carl Edwards (Ford; Roush Fenway Racing) 835

Basketball
FIBA Americas Championship in Mar del Plata, Argentina (teams in bold advance to the semifinals):
Second round:
 79–74 
 76–84 
 111–93 
 65–90 
Standings (after 5 games): Argentina 10 points, Brazil, Puerto Rico, Dominican Republic 9, Venezuela, Canada, Uruguay 6, Panama 5.

Cricket
India in England:
2nd ODI in Southampton:  187/8 (23/23 overs);  188/3 (22.1 overs). England win by 7 wickets; lead 5-match series 1–0.
ICC Intercontinental Cup:
In Belfast, day 1:  244 (70.1 overs; George Dockrell 5/71);  75/4 (20.4 overs). Ireland trail by 169 runs with 6 wickets remaining in the 1st innings.

Cycling
Grand Tours:
Vuelta a España, Stage 16:  Juan José Haedo  4h 41' 56"  Alessandro Petacchi  s.t.  Daniele Bennati  s.t.
General classification (after stage 16): (1) Juan José Cobo   64h 39' 14" (2) Chris Froome  + 22" (3) Bradley Wiggins  + 51"

Football (soccer)
UEFA Euro 2012 qualifying, matchday 10 (teams in bold qualify for the Finals):
Group A:
 3–2 
 0–0 
Standings (after 8 matches):  24 points, Turkey 14,  12, Austria 8, Azerbaijan 7, Kazakhstan 3.
Group B:
 0–0 
 1–0 
 0–4 
Standings (after 8 matches): Russia 17 points, Republic of Ireland 15, Armenia, Slovakia 14, Macedonia 7, Andorra 0.
Group C:
 3–1 
 4–1 
 1–0 
Standings: Italy 22 points (8 matches), Serbia 14 (8), Estonia 13 (9), Slovenia 11 (9), Northern Ireland 9 (8), Faroe Islands 4 (10).
Group D:
 1–0 
 2–1 
 0–0 
Standings: France 17 points (8 matches), Bosnia and Herzegovina 16 (8), Romania 12 (8), Belarus 12 (9), Albania 8 (8), Luxembourg 4 (9).
Group E:
 0–2 
 0–2 
 0–5 
Standings: Netherlands 24 points (8 matches), Sweden 18 (8), Hungary 18 (9), Finland 9 (8), Moldova 6 (8), San Marino 0 (9).
Group F:
 3–1 
 1–1 
 1–1 
Standings: Croatia 19 points (8 matches), Greece 18 (8), Israel 13 (9), Georgia 10 (9), Latvia 8 (8), Malta 1 (8).
Group G:
 3–1 
 1–0 
Standings: England 17 points (7 matches),  11 (6), Switzerland 8 (6), Bulgaria 5 (7), Wales 3 (6).
Group H:
 2–0 
 1–0 
Standings: , Denmark 13 points (6 matches), Norway 13 (7), Iceland 4 (7), Cyprus 2 (6).
Group I:
 1–0 
 6–0 
Standings: Spain 18 points (6 matches),  10 (6), Scotland 8 (6), Lithuania 5 (7), Liechtenstein 4 (7).
2014 FIFA World Cup qualification – AFC Third Round, matchday 2:
Group A:
 0–2 
 2–1 
Standings (after 2 matches): Jordan 6 points, China PR, Iraq 3, Singapore 0.
Group B:
 3–1 
 1–1 
Standings (after 2 matches): South Korea, Kuwait 4 points, Lebanon 3, United Arab Emirates 0.
Group C:
 1–0 
 1–1 
Standings (after 2 matches): Uzbekistan, Japan 4 points, North Korea 3, Tajikistan 0.
Group D:
 3–0 
 1–3 
Standings (after 2 matches): Australia 6 points, Thailand 3, Saudi Arabia, Oman 1.
Group E:
 0–2 
 1–1 
Standings (after 2 matches): Iran, Bahrain 4 points, Qatar 2, Indonesia 0.
2014 FIFA World Cup qualification – CONCACAF Second Round, matchday 2:
Group A:
 1–1 
 1–4 
Standings (after 2 matches): El Salvador 6 points, Suriname 4, Dominican Republic 1, Cayman Islands 0.
Group B:
 0–2 
 2–1 
Standings (after 2 matches): Guyana, Trinidad and Tobago 6 points, Bermuda, Barbados 0.
Group C:  1–2 
Standings: Nicaragua 3 points (2 matches), Panama 3 (1),  0 (1).
Group D:
 2–4 
 0–3 
Standings (after 2 matches): Canada 6 points, Saint Kitts and Nevis 4, Puerto Rico 1, Saint Lucia 0.
Group E:  1–2 
Standings: Guatemala 6 points (2 matches), Belize 3 (2),  0 (1).
Group F:
 1–8 
 2–4 
Standings (after 2 matches): Antigua and Barbuda, Haiti 6 points, Curaçao, U.S. Virgin Islands 0.
Friendly internationals (top 10 in FIFA World Rankings):
 2–2 (3) 
(9)  3–1  in Dhaka, Bangladesh
FIFA Beach Soccer World Cup in Ravenna, Italy (teams in bold advance to the quarterfinals):
Group C:
 3–7 
 1–4 
Final standings: Russia 9 points, Nigeria 6, Tahiti 3, Venezuela 0.
Group D:
 1–1 (0–1 pen.) 
 3–2 
Final standings: Brazil 8 points, Mexico 5, Ukraine 3, Japan 0.
Copa Sudamericana Second stage, second leg (first leg score in parentheses): Estudiantes  1–0 (0–2)  Arsenal. 3–3 on points, Arsenal win 2–1 on aggregate.

Snooker
Shanghai Masters in Shanghai, China, last 32:
Mark Allen  5–2 Ryan Day 
Shaun Murphy  5–4 Dominic Dale 
Ali Carter  4–5 Mark King 
Peter Ebdon  3–5 Fergal O'Brien 
Ronnie O'Sullivan  5–1 James Wattana 
Jamie Cope  5–3 Jack Lisowski 
Stephen Maguire  4–5 Anthony Hamilton 
Mark Selby  5–3 Nigel Bond

Tennis
Grand Slams:
US Open in New York City, United States, day 9: All matches postponed due to inclement weather.

September 5, 2011 (Monday)

Basketball
EuroBasket in Lithuania (teams in bold advance to the Second Round):
Group A in Panevėžys:
 88–81 
 57–65 
 69–98 
Final standings: Spain, Lithuania 9 points, Turkey 8, Great Britain, Poland 7, Portugal 5.
Group B in Šiauliai:
 96–95 (OT) 
 80–81 
 96–97 (OT) 
Final standings: France 10 points, Serbia 9, Germany 8, Israel 7, Italy 6, Latvia 5.
Group C in Alytus:
 71–65 
 74–69 
 75–63 
Final standings: Macedonia, Greece 9 points, Finland, Croatia, Bosnia and Herzegovina 7, Montenegro 6.
Group D in Klaipėda:
 69–79 
 64–65 
 74–61 
Final standings: Russia 10 points, Slovenia 9, Georgia, Bulgaria, Ukraine 7, Belgium 5.
FIBA Americas Championship in Mar del Plata, Argentina:
Second round:
 92–68 
 82–94 
 53–79 
 93–66 
Standings (after 4 games): Argentina 8 points, Puerto Rico, Brazil, Dominican Republic 7, Venezuela, Canada, Uruguay 5, Panama 4.

Cricket
Pakistan in Zimbabwe:
Only Test in Bulawayo, day 5:  412 & 141 (56.3 overs);  466 & 88/3 (21.4 overs). Pakistan win by 7 wickets.

Football (soccer)
2012 Olympics Women's Asian Qualifiers Final Round in Jinan, China:
 2–3 
 1–0 
 0–2 
Standings (after 3 matches): Japan 9 points, North Korea 7, China PR 5, Australia 3, South Korea 1, Thailand 0.
Friendly internationals (top 10 in FIFA World Rankings):
(6)  1–0  in London, England
FIFA Beach Soccer World Cup in Ravenna, Italy (teams in bold advance to the quarterfinals):
Group A:
 3–5 
 3–2 
Final standings: Italy 7 points, Senegal 5, Switzerland 3, Iran 0.
Group B:
 8–3 
 4–3 
Final standings: Portugal 9 points, El Salvador 6, Argentina 3, Oman 0.

Golf
PGA Tour:
FedEx Cup Playoffs: Deutsche Bank Championship in Norton, Massachusetts (all USA):
Winner: Webb Simpson 269 (−15)PO
Simpson defeats Chez Reavie on the second playoff hole to win his second tournament in three weeks, and also his second career PGA Tour title.
Fedex Cup standings: (1) Simpson 4711 points (2) Dustin Johnson 3814 (3) Matt Kuchar 3124

Snooker
Shanghai Masters in Shanghai, China, wildcard round:
Anthony Hamilton  5–0 Li Hang 
Jack Lisowski  5–2 Rouzi Maimaiti 
James Wattana  5–1 Jin Long 
Fergal O'Brien  5–1 Hossein Vafaei 
Robert Milkins  5–0 Tang Jun 
Michael Holt  5–3 Cai Jianzhong 
Nigel Bond  5–2 Thanawat Thirapongpaiboon 
Dominic Dale  5–3 Cao Xinlong

Tennis
Grand Slams:
US Open in New York City, United States, day 8:
Men's Singles, fourth round:
Novak Djokovic  [1] def. Alexandr Dolgopolov  [22] 7–6(14), 6–4, 6–2
Roger Federer  [3] def. Juan Mónaco  6–1, 6–2, 6–0
Jo-Wilfried Tsonga  [11] def. Mardy Fish  [8] 6–4, 6–7(5), 3–6, 6–4, 6–2
Janko Tipsarević  [20] def. Juan Carlos Ferrero  7–5, 6–7(3), 7–5, 6–2
Women's Singles, fourth round:
Caroline Wozniacki  [1] def. Svetlana Kuznetsova  [15] 6–7(6), 7–5, 6–1
Anastasia Pavlyuchenkova  [17] def. Francesca Schiavone  [7] 5–7, 6–3, 6–4
Andrea Petkovic  [10] def. Carla Suárez Navarro  6–1, 6–4
Serena Williams  [28] def. Ana Ivanovic  [16] 6–3, 6–4

September 4, 2011 (Sunday)

American football
NCAA AP Top 10: (8) Texas A&M 46, SMU 14

Athletics
World Championships in Daegu, South Korea:
Men's Marathon:  Abel Kirui  2:07:38  Vincent Kipruto  2:10:06  Feyisa Lilesa  2:10:32
Kirui wins the event for the second successive time.
Women's hammer throw:  Tatyana Lysenko  77.13m  Betty Heidler  76.06m  Zhang Wenxiu  75.03m
Men's triple jump:  Christian Taylor  17.96m  Phillips Idowu  17.77m  Will Claye  17.50m
Men's 5000 metres:  Mo Farah  13:23.36  Bernard Lagat  13:23.64  Dejen Gebremeskel  13:23.92
Ethiopian Imane Merga is originally awarded the bronze medal, but he is later disqualified.
Women's 800 metres:  Mariya Savinova  1:55.87  Caster Semenya  1:56.35  Janeth Jepkosgei  1:57.42
Women's 4 × 100 metres relay:   (Bianca Knight, Allyson Felix, Marshevet Myers, Carmelita Jeter) 41.56   (Shelly-Ann Fraser-Pryce, Kerron Stewart, Sherone Simpson, Veronica Campbell-Brown) 41.70   (Olesya Povh, Nataliya Pohrebnyak, Mariya Ryemyen, Khrystyna Stuy) 42.51
Felix wins the event for the second time, and her second title of the championships and eighth overall.
Jeter wins the event for the second time, and her second title of the championships and third overall.
Men's 4 × 100 metres relay:   (Nesta Carter, Michael Frater, Yohan Blake, Usain Bolt) 37.04 (WR)   (Teddy Tinmar, Christophe Lemaitre, Yannick Lesourd, Jimmy Vicaut) 38.20   (Jason Rogers, Kim Collins, Antoine Adams, Brijesh Lawrence) 38.49
Jamaica win the event for the second successive time.
Bolt wins the event for the second time, and his second title of the championships and fifth overall.
Frater wins the event for the second time.
Blake wins his second title of the championships.

Auto racing
Sprint Cup Series:
AdvoCare 500 in Hampton, Georgia: Race postponed to 11:00 am EDT on September 6, due to rain.
IndyCar Series:
Baltimore Grand Prix in Baltimore: (1) Will Power  (Team Penske) (2) Oriol Servià  (Newman/Haas Racing) (3) Tony Kanaan  (KV Racing Technology – Lotus)
Drivers' championship standings (after 15 of 18 races): (1) Dario Franchitti  (Chip Ganassi Racing) 507 points (2) Power 502 (3) Scott Dixon  (Chip Ganassi Racing) 430
World Touring Car Championship:
Race of Spain in Valencia:
Race 1: (1) Yvan Muller  (Chevrolet; Chevrolet Cruze) (2) Alain Menu  (Chevrolet; Chevrolet Cruze) (3) Tom Coronel  (ROAL Motorsport; BMW 320 TC)
Race 2: (1) Muller (2) Robert Huff  (Chevrolet; Chevrolet Cruze) (3) Menu
Drivers' championship standings (after 9 of 12 rounds): (1) Muller 333 points (2) Huff 317 (3) Menu 253

Basketball
EuroBasket in Lithuania (teams in bold advance to the Second Round):
Group A in Panevėžys:
 85–73 
 84–83 
 79–91 
Standings (after 4 games): Spain 8 points, Lithuania 7, Poland, Turkey 6, Great Britain 5, Portugal 4.
Group B in Šiauliai:
 91–88 
 84–91 
 64–75 
Standings (after 4 games): Serbia, France 8 points, Germany 6, Italy, Israel 5, Latvia 4.
Group C in Alytus:
 72–70 
 55–71 
 92–80 
Standings (after 4 games): Macedonia, Greece 7 points, Bosnia and Herzegovina, Croatia 6, Finland, Montenegro 5.
Group D in Klaipėda:
 69–53 
 77–89 
 61–70 
Standings (after 4 games): Russia, Slovenia 8 points, Georgia 6, Ukraine, Bulgaria 5, Belgium 4.

Cricket
Pakistan in Zimbabwe:
Only Test in Bulawayo, day 4:  412 & 135/8 (54 overs);  466 (156.1 overs). Zimbabwe lead by 81 runs with 2 wickets remaining.

Cycling
Grand Tours:
Vuelta a España, Stage 15:  Juan José Cobo  4h 01' 56"  Wout Poels  + 48"  Denis Menchov  + 48"
General classification (after stage 15): (1) Cobo  59h 57' 16" (2) Chris Froome  + 20" (3) Bradley Wiggins  + 46"
Mountain Bike & Trials World Championships in Champéry, Switzerland:
Women's downhill:  Emmeline Ragot  4:54.012  Rachel Atherton  5:09.303  Claire Buchar  5:21.965
Men's downhill:  Danny Hart  3:41.989  Damien Spagnolo  3:53.688  Samuel Blenkinsop  3:54.982
Men's trials 26":  Bjorn Levin   Vladyslav Chernysh   Sam Oliver

Equestrianism
Eventing – Burghley Horse Trials at Burghley House, United Kingdom (CCI 4*):  William Fox-Pitt  on Parklane Hawk  Andrew Nicholson  on Nereo  Mary King  on Kings Temptress
Show jumping – Global Champions Tour:
9th Competition in Rio de Janeiro, Brazil (CSI 5*):  Gerco Schröder  on London   Edwina Alexander  on Itot du Château  Philipp Weishaupt  on Monte Bellini
Standings (after 9 of 10 competitions): (1) Alexander 238 points (2) Ludger Beerbaum  218.5 (3) Álvaro de Miranda Neto  194

Football (soccer)
2012 Africa Cup of Nations qualification, matchday 5 (teams in bold qualify for the Finals):
Group A:  3–0 
Standings (after 5 matches):  9 points, Zimbabwe 8,  7, Liberia 4.
Group B:
 0–2 
 1–0 
Standings (after 5 matches): Guinea 13 points, Nigeria 10, Ethiopia 4, Madagascar 1.
Group C:  1–2 
Standings (after 5 matches): Zambia 12 points,  11,  4, Comoros 1.
Group D:  0–0 
Standings (after 5 matches): Morocco, Central African Republic 8 points,  5.
Group G:  2–1 
Standings (after 5 matches): Niger 9 points, South Africa,  8,  2.
Group H:  1–1 
Standings (after 5 matches):  15 points, Burundi, Benin 5,  3.
Group I:  0–1 
Standings (after 5 matches): , Sudan 13 points, Congo 3,  0.
Group J:  2–0 
Standings (after 5 matches): Uganda 10 points, Angola 9,  7,  3.
Group K:  1–0 
Standings (after 7 matches unless stated): Botswana 17 points (8 matches),  11, Togo 6,  2.
FIFA Beach Soccer World Cup in Ravenna, Italy (teams in bold advance to the quarterfinals):
Group C:
 3–5 
 5–0 
Standings (after 2 matches): Russia 6 points, Nigeria, Tahiti 3, Venezuela 0.
Group D:
 4–2 
 2–5 
Standings (after 2 matches): Brazil 5 points, Ukraine, Mexico 3, Japan 0.

Golf
European Tour:
Omega European Masters in Crans-Montana, Switzerland:
Winner: Thomas Bjørn  264 (−20)
Bjørn wins for the second successive week, for his third European Tour title of the year, and 13th of his career.

Hurling
All-Ireland Championship Final in Dublin: Kilkenny 2–17 – 1–16 Tipperary
Kilkenny win the title for the 33rd time.

Motorcycle racing
Moto GP:
San Marino Grand Prix in Misano Adriatico, Italy (ESP unless stated):
MotoGP: (1) Jorge Lorenzo (Yamaha) (2) Dani Pedrosa (Honda) (3) Casey Stoner  (Honda)
Riders' championship standings (after 13 of 18 races): (1) Stoner 259 points (2) Pedrosa 224 (3) Andrea Dovizioso  (Honda) 185
Moto2: (1) Marc Márquez (Suter) (2) Stefan Bradl  (Kalex) (3) Andrea Iannone  (Suter)
Riders' championship standings (after 12 of 17 races): (1) Bradl 213 points (2) Márquez 190 (3) Iannone 112
125cc: (1) Nicolás Terol (Aprilia) (2) Johann Zarco  (Derbi) (3) Efrén Vázquez (Derbi)
Riders' championship standings (after 12 of 17 races): (1) Terol 216 points (2) Zarco 185 (3) Maverick Viñales (Aprilia) 161
Superbike:
Nürburgring World Championship round in Nürburg, Germany:
Race 1: (1) Carlos Checa  (Ducati 1098R) (2) Marco Melandri  (Yamaha YZF-R1) (3) Noriyuki Haga  (Ducati 1098R)
Race 2: (1) Tom Sykes  (Kawasaki Ninja ZX-10R) (2) Sylvain Guintoli  (Ducati 1098R) (3) Jakub Smrž  (Ducati 1098R)
Riders' championship standings (after 10 of 13 rounds): (1) Checa 376 points (2) Melandri 302 (3) Max Biaggi  (Aprilia RSV4) 281
Supersport:
Nürburgring World Championship round in Nürburg, Germany (all GBR): (1) Chaz Davies (Yamaha YZF-R6) (2) James Ellison (Honda CBR600RR) (3) Sam Lowes (Honda CBR600RR)
Riders' championship standings (after 9 of 12 rounds): (1) Davies 171 points (2) David Salom  (Kawasaki Ninja ZX-6R) 112 (3) Fabien Foret  (Honda CBR600RR) 111

Rowing
World Championships in Lake Bled, Slovenia:
Men:
Lightweight quadruple sculls (LM4x):   (Francesco Rigon, Daniele Gilardoni, Franco Sancassani, Stefano Basalini) 6:00.95   (Michael Wieler, Stefan Wallat, Jonas Schützeberg, Ingo Voigt) 6:01.08   (Steffen Jensen, Martin Batenburg, Christian Nielsen, Hans Christian Sørensen) 6:02.81
Gilardoni wins the event for the 11th time.
Sancassani wins the event for the eighth time and his ninth title overall.
Basalini wins the event for the fourth time and his seventh title overall.
Lightweight Eights (LM8+):   (Thomas Bertrand, Ross Brown, Blair Tunevitsch, Thomas Gibson, Alister Foot, Roderick Chisholm, Nicholas Baker, Darryn Purcell, David Webster) 5:44.57   (Luigi Scala, Fabrizio Gabriele, Davide Riccardi, Gianluca Santi, Livio La Padula, Catello Amarante, Jiri Vlcek, Giorgio Tuccinardi, Gianluca Barattolo) 5:44.73   (Lasse Dittmann, Daniel Graff, Anders Hansen, Jens Vilhelmsen, Thorbjørn Patscheider, Jacob Larsen, Christian Pedersen, Martin Kristensen, Emil Blach) 5:46.75
Webster wins his second world championships title.
Coxless fours (M4-):   (Matt Langridge, Richard Egington, Tom James, Alex Gregory) 5:55.18   (Stergios Papachristos, Ioannis Tsilis, Georgios Tziallas, Ioannis Christou) 5:57.20   (Samuel Loch, Drew Ginn, Nicholas Purnell, Josh Dunkley-Smith) 5:58.44
Egington, James and Gregory all win the event for the second time.
Lightweight double sculls (LM2x):   (Zac Purchase, Mark Hunter) 6:18.67   (Storm Uru, Peter Taylor) 6:19.01   (Lorenzo Bertini, Elia Luini) 6:21.33
Purchase and Hunter win the event for the second successive time.
Purchase also wins his third title overall.
Women:
Lightweight double sculls (LW2x):   (Christina Giazitzidou, Alexandra Tsiavou) 6:59.80   (Lindsay Jennerich, Patricia Obee) 7:03.46   (Hester Goodsell, Sophie Hosking) 7:04.33
Giazitzidou and Tsiavou win the event for the second time.
Single sculls (W1x):  Mirka Knapková  7:26.64  Ekaterina Karsten  7:28.68  Emma Twigg  7:30.68
Adaptive:
Mixed coxed fours (LTAMix4+):   (Pam Relph, Naomi Riches, David Smith, James Roe, Lily van den Broecke) 3:27.10   (Anthony Theriault, David Blair, Victoria Nolan, Meghan Montgomery, Laura Comeau) 3:31.84   (Anke Molkenthin, Christiane Quirin, Martin Lossau, Michael Schulz, Katrin Splitt) 3:33.27

Rugby union
 ITM Cup Championship Final in Palmerston North: Manawatu  30–35  Hawke's Bay
Hawke's Bay secures a place in the 2012 ITM Cup Premiership.

Tennis
Grand Slams:
US Open in New York City, United States, day 7:
Men's Singles, third round:
Rafael Nadal  [2] def. David Nalbandian  7–6(5), 6–1, 7–5
Andy Murray  [4] def. Feliciano López  [25] 6–1, 6–4, 6–2
David Ferrer  [5] def. Florian Mayer  [26] 6–1, 6–2, 7–6(2)
Women's Singles, fourth round:
Vera Zvonareva  [2] def. Sabine Lisicki  [22] 6–2, 6–3
Samantha Stosur  [9] def. Maria Kirilenko  [25] 6–2, 6–7(15), 6–3
Flavia Pennetta  [26] def. Peng Shuai  [13] 6–4, 7–6(6)
Angelique Kerber  def. Monica Niculescu  6–4, 6–3

September 3, 2011 (Saturday)

American football
NCAA AP Top 10:
(1) Oklahoma 47, Tulsa 14
(2) Alabama 48, Kent State 7
Cowboys Classic in Arlington, Texas: (3) LSU 40, (4) Oregon 27
Chick-fil-A Kickoff Game in Atlanta: (5) Boise State 35, (19) Georgia 21
(6) Florida State 34, Louisiana–Monroe 0
(7) Stanford 57, San Jose State 3
(9) Oklahoma State 61, Louisiana–Lafayette 34
(10) Nebraska 40, Chattanooga 7
Other games: South Florida 23, (16) Notre Dame 20

Athletics
World Championships in Daegu, South Korea:
Men's 50 kilometres walk:  Sergey Bakulin  3:41:24  Denis Nizhegorodov  3:42:45  Jared Tallent  3:43:36
Women's high jump:  Anna Chicherova  2.03m  Blanka Vlašić  2.03m  Antonietta Di Martino  2.00m
Men's javelin throw:  Matthias de Zordo  86.27m  Andreas Thorkildsen  84.78m  Guillermo Martínez  84.30m
Women's 800 metres T54:  Diane Roy  1:50.91  Wakako Tsuchida  1:51.11  Shelly Woods  1:51.27
Men's 400 metres T53:  Richard Colman  49.36  Byung-hoon Yoo  50.69  Dong-ho Jung  50.76
Men's 1500 metres:  Asbel Kiprop  3:35.69  Silas Kiplagat  3:35.92  Matthew Centrowitz Jr.  3:36.08
Women's 4 × 400 metres relay:   (Sanya Richards-Ross; Allyson Felix; Jessica Beard; Francena McCorory) 3:18.09   (Rosemarie Whyte; Davita Prendergast; Novlene Williams-Mills; Shericka Williams) 3:18.71   (Antonina Krivoshapka; Natalya Antyukh; Lyudmila Litvinova; Anastasiya Kapachinskaya) 3:19.36
The United States win the event for the third successive time.
Richards-Ross wins the event for the fourth time and her fifth title overall.
Felix wins the event for the third time and her seventh title overall.
Beard wins the event for the second time.
Women's 100 metres hurdles:  Sally Pearson  12.28 (CR)  Danielle Carruthers  12.47  Dawn Harper  12.47
Pearson sets the fastest time since 1992 and becomes the fourth-best all-time athlete in this event.
Men's 200 metres:  Usain Bolt  19.40  Walter Dix  19.70  Christophe Lemaitre  19.80
Bolt wins the event for the second successive time and his fourth title overall, as he sets the fourth-best time in this event.

Auto racing
Nationwide Series:
Great Clips 300 in Hampton, Georgia: (1)  Carl Edwards (Ford; Roush Fenway Racing) (2)  Kyle Busch (Toyota; Joe Gibbs Racing) (3)  Ricky Stenhouse Jr. (Ford; Roush Fenway Racing)
Drivers' championship standings (after 26 of 34 races): (1) Stenhouse Jr. 909 points (2)  Elliott Sadler (Chevrolet; Kevin Harvick Incorporated) 896 (3)  Reed Sorenson (Chevrolet; Turner Motorsports) 869

Basketball
EuroBasket in Lithuania (team in bold advances to the Second Round):
Group C in Alytus:
 92–64 
 58–72 
 87–81 
Standings (after 3 games): Greece, Macedonia, Croatia 5 points, Finland, Montenegro, Bosnia and Herzegovina 4.
Group D in Klaipėda:
 67–56 
 87–75 
 79–58 
Standings (after 3 games): Russia, Slovenia 6 points, Georgia, Ukraine, Bulgaria 4, Belgium 3.
FIBA Americas Championship in Mar del Plata, Argentina (teams in bold advance to the quarterfinals):
Group A:
 103–98 
 83–93 
Final standings: , Brazil 7 points, Venezuela, Canada 6, Cuba 4.
Group B:
 79–66 
 90–71 
Final standings: Argentina 8 points, 7,  Uruguay 6, Panama 5, Paraguay 4.

Cricket
Australia in Sri Lanka:
1st Test in Galle, day 4:  273 & 210;  105 & 253 (95.5 overs; Mahela Jayawardene 105, Ryan Harris 5/62). Australia win by 125 runs; lead 3-match series 1–0.
Pakistan in Zimbabwe:
Only Test in Bulawayo, day 3:  412;  357/5 (120.1 overs; Mohammad Hafeez 119). Pakistan trail by 55 runs with 5 wickets remaining in the 1st innings.
India in England:
1st ODI in Chester-le-Street:  274/7 (50 overs);  27/2 (7.2 overs). No result; 5-match series tied 0–0.

Cycling
Grand Tours:
Vuelta a España, Stage 14:  Rein Taaramäe  4h 39' 01"  Juan José Cobo  + 25"  David de la Fuente  + 29"
General classification (after stage 14): (1) Bradley Wiggins   55h 54' 45" (2) Chris Froome  + 7" (3) Bauke Mollema   + 36"
Mountain Bike & Trials World Championships in Champéry, Switzerland:
Women's cross-country:  Catharine Pendrel  1:46:14  Maja Włoszczowska  1:46:42  Eva Lechner  1:47:50
Men's cross-country:  Jaroslav Kulhavý  1:44:30  Nino Schurter  1:45:17  Julien Absalon  1:45:56
Men's trials 20":  Benito Ros   Abel Mustieles   Gilles Coustellier

Equestrianism
Show jumping – Nations Cup European Promotional League:
Nations Cup of Spain in Gijón, Spain (CSIO 5*):   (Pilar Cordón, Eduardo Alvarez Aznar, Jesus Garmendia, Julio Arias Cueva)   (Scott Brash, David McPherson, Bruce Menzies, Robert Whitaker)   (Malin Baryard-Johnsson, Helena Persson, Peder Fredricson, Svante Johansson)
Final standings: (1)  60.5 points (2) Sweden 54 (3)  48.5
Switzerland are promoted to the 2012 FEI Nations Cup.

Figure skating
ISU Junior Grand Prix:
JGP Volvo Cup in Riga, Latvia:
Men:  Ryuju Hino  182.71 points  Zhang He  182.38  Timothy Dolensky  176.77
Ice dancing:  Maria Nosulia/Evgen Kholoniuk  124.84 points  Evgenia Kosigina/Nikolai Moroshkin  119.24  Alexandra Aldridge/Daniel Eaton  118.18

Football (soccer)
UEFA Euro 2012 qualifying, matchday 9:
Group I:  2–2 
Standings:  15 points (5 matches), Czech Republic 10 (6), Scotland 5 (5),  5 (6),  4 (6).
2012 Africa Cup of Nations qualification, matchday 5 (teams in bold qualify for the Finals):
Group A:  3–0 
Standings: Mali 9 points (5 matches), Cape Verde 7 (5),  5 (4),  4 (4).
Group C:  1–0 
Standings: Libya 11 points (5 matches),  9 (4), Mozambique 4 (5),  1 (4).
Group D:  1–1 
Standings: ,  7 points (4 matches), Tanzania, Algeria 5 (5).
Group E:
 6–0 
 2–0 
Standings (after 5 matches): Senegal 13 points, Cameroon 8, Congo DR 7, Mauritius 0.
Group F:  1–0 
Standings:  9 points (3 matches), Gambia 3 (3), Namibia 3 (4).
Group G:  2–1 
Standings:  8 points (4 matches), Sierra Leone 8 (5),  6 (4), Egypt 2 (4).
Group H:  0–5 
Standings: Côte d'Ivoire 15 points (5 matches),  4 (4), Rwanda 3 (5).
Group J:  2–1 
Standings:  10 points (4 matches), Kenya 7 (5),  6 (4), Guinea-Bissau 3 (5).
Group K:  0–0 
Standings:  17 points (7 matches), Malawi, Tunisia 11 (7),  3 (6),  2 (7).
2012 Olympics Women's Asian Qualifiers Final Round in Jinan, China:
 5–1 
 0–0 
 1–2 
Standings (after 2 matches): Japan 6 points, North Korea 4, Australia 3, China PR 2, South Korea 1, Thailand 0.
FIFA Beach Soccer World Cup in Ravenna, Italy (team in bold advances to the quarterfinals):
Group A:
 4–6 
 4–4 (2–3 pen.) 
Standings (after 2 matches): Italy 4 points, Switzerland 3, Senegal 2, Iran 0.
Group B:
 5–0 
 3–4 
Standings (after 2 matches): Portugal 6 points, Argentina, El Salvador 3, Oman 0.

Rowing
World Championships in Lake Bled, Slovenia:
Men:
Quadruple sculls (M4x):   (Chris Morgan, James McRae, Karsten Forsterling, Daniel Noonan) 5:39.31   (Karl Schulze, Philipp Wende, Lauritz Schoof, Tim Grohmann) 5:39.56   (David Šain, Martin Sinković, Damir Martin, Valent Sinković) 5:42.82
Morgan wins his second world championships title.
Coxless pairs (M2-):   (Eric Murray, Hamish Bond) 6:14.77   (Pete Reed, Andrew Triggs-Hodge) 6:16.27   (Niccolò Mornati, Lorenzo Carboncini) 6:21.33
Murray and Bond win the event for the third successive time and their fourth title overall.
Single sculls (M1x):  Mahé Drysdale  6:39.56  Ondřej Synek  6:40.05  Alan Campbell  6:44.86
Drysdale wins the event for the fifth time.
Women:
Lightweight quadruple sculls (LW4x):   (Stephanie Cullen, Imogen Walsh, Kathryn Twyman, Andrea Dennis) 6:28.14   (Pan Dandan, Tang Chanjuan, Liu Jing, Yan Xiaohua) 6:30.41   (Hillary Saeger, Nicole Dinion, Lindsey Hochman, Katherine Robinson) 6:33.91
Coxless fours (W4-):   (Sarah Zelenka, Kara Kohler, Emily Regan, Sara Hendershot) 6:30.30   (Peta White, Renee Chatterton, Pauline Frasca, Kate Hornsey) 6:31.18   (Wianka van Dorp, Olivia van Rooijen, Ellen Hogerwerf, Femke Dekker) 6:34.06
Double sculls (W2x):   (Anna Watkins, Katherine Grainger) 6:44.73   (Kerry Hore, Kim Crow) 6:45.98   (Fiona Paterson, Anna Reymer) 6:46.74
Watkins and Grainger win the event for the second successive time.
Grainger also wins her sixth title overall.
Adaptive:
Mixed double sculls (TAMix2x):   (Lou Xiaoxian, Fei Tianming)   (Perle Bouge, Stephane Tardieu)   (John Maclean, Kathryn Ross)

Rugby union
 ITM Cup Premiership Final in Hamilton: Waikato  3–12  Canterbury
Canterbury win the title for the fourth successive time and ninth overall.

Tennis
Grand Slams:
US Open in New York City, United States, day 6:
Men's Singles, third round:
Novak Djokovic  [1] def. Nikolay Davydenko  6–3, 6–4, 6–2
Roger Federer  [3] def. Marin Čilić  [27] 6–3, 4–6, 6–4, 6–2
Mardy Fish  [8] def. Kevin Anderson  6–4, 7–6(4), 7–6(3)
Janko Tipsarević  [20] def. Tomáš Berdych  [9] 6–4, 5–0 retired
Women's Singles, third round:
Caroline Wozniacki  [1] def. Vania King  6–2, 6–4
Serena Williams  [28] def. Victoria Azarenka  [4] 6–1, 7–6(5)
Francesca Schiavone  [7] def. Chanelle Scheepers  5–7, 7–6(5), 6–3
Andrea Petkovic  [10] def. Roberta Vinci  [18] 6–4, 6–0

Volleyball
Men's NORCECA Championship in Mayagüez, Puerto Rico:
Bronze medal match:   3–0 
Final:   2–3  
Cuba win the title for the second successive time and 15th overall.
Cuba and the United States both qualify for the World Cup.

September 2, 2011 (Friday)

American football
NCAA AP Top 25: Baylor 50, (14) TCU 48

Athletics
World Championships in Daegu, South Korea:
Men's shot put:  David Storl  21.78m  Dylan Armstrong  21.64m  Andrei Mikhnevich  21.40m
Women's javelin throw:  Mariya Abakumova  71.99m (CR)  Barbora Špotáková  71.58m  Sunette Viljoen  68.38m
Abakumova sets the second best all-time result.
Men's long jump:  Dwight Phillips  8.45m  Mitchell Watt  8.33m  Ngonidzashe Makusha  8.29m
Phillips wins the event for the second successive time and fourth time overall.
Women's 5000 metres:  Vivian Cheruiyot  14:55.36  Sylvia Jebiwott Kibet  14:56.21  Meseret Defar  14:56.94
Cheruiyot wins the event for the second successive time, and her second title of the championships and third overall.
Women's 200 metres:  Veronica Campbell-Brown  22.22  Carmelita Jeter  22.37  Allyson Felix  22.42
Campbell-Brown wins her second world championships title.
Men's 4 × 400 metres relay:   (Greg Nixon, Bershawn Jackson, Angelo Taylor, LaShawn Merritt) 2:59.31   (Shane Victor, Ofentse Mogawane, Willem de Beer, L. J. van Zyl) 2:59.87   (Allodin Fothergill, Jermaine Gonzales, Riker Hylton, Leford Green) 3:00.10
The United States win the event for the fourth successive time.
Merritt wins the event for the third time and his fourth title overall.
Taylor wins the event for the third time.
Jackson wins the event for the second time and his third title overall.

Basketball
EuroBasket in Lithuania (teams in bold advance to the Second Round):
Group A in Panevėžys:
 88–69 
 73–81 
 68–75 
Standings (after 3 games): Lithuania, Spain 6 points, Turkey 5, Poland 4, Portugal, Great Britain 3.
Group B in Šiauliai:
 89–80 
 62–71 
 76–65 
Standings (after 3 games): France, Serbia 6 points, Germany 5, Italy 4, Latvia, Israel 3.
FIBA Americas Championship in Mar del Plata, Argentina (teams in bold advance to the quarterfinals):
Group A:
 84–62 
 74–79 
Standings (after 3 games unless stated): Dominican Republic 7 points (4 games), Brazil, Canada 5,  4, Cuba 3.
Group B:
 61–77 
 74–81 
Standings (after 3 games unless stated): Puerto Rico 7 points (4 games), Argentina 6, Uruguay, Panama 4,  3.

Cricket
Australia in Sri Lanka:
1st Test in Galle, day 3:  273 & 210 (59.2 overs; Rangana Herath 5/79);  105 & 120/5 (52 overs). Sri Lanka require another 259 runs with 5 wickets remaining.
Pakistan in Zimbabwe:
Only Test in Bulawayo, day 2:  412 (150.4 overs; Tino Mawoyo 163*);  116/1 (29 overs). Pakistan trail by 296 runs with 9 wickets remaining in the 1st innings.

Cycling
Grand Tours:
Vuelta a España, Stage 13:  Michael Albasini  4h 19' 39"  Eros Capecchi  s.t.  Daniel Moreno  s.t.
General classification (after stage 13): (1) Bradley Wiggins   51h 14' 59" (2) Vincenzo Nibali  + 4" (3) Chris Froome  + 7"
Mountain Bike & Trials World Championships in Champéry, Switzerland:
Women's trials:  Karin Moor   Gemma Abant   Mireia Abant 
Men's four-cross:  Michal Prokop   Roger Rinderknecht   Joost Wichman 
Women's four-cross:  Anneke Beerten   Fionn Griffiths   Celine Gros

Figure skating
ISU Junior Grand Prix:
JGP Volvo Cup in Riga, Latvia:
Pairs:  Sui Wenjing/Han Cong  152.08 points  Yu Xiaoyu/Jin Yang  139.70  Margaret Purdy/Michael Marinaro  134.46
Ladies:  Polina Shelepen  153.40 points  Li Zijun  148.19  Polina Agafonova  141.84

Football (soccer)
UEFA Euro 2012 qualifying, matchday 9 (team in bold qualify for the Finals):
Group A:
 1–1 
 2–1 
 6–2 
Standings: Germany 24 points (8 matches), Turkey 13 (7), Belgium 12 (8), Austria 7 (7), Azerbaijan 4 (7), Kazakhstan 3 (7).
Group B:
 0–3 
 1–0 
 0–0 
Standings (after 7 matches): Russia 16 points, Republic of Ireland, Slovakia 14, Armenia 11, Macedonia 4, Andorra 0.
Group C:
 1–2 
 0–1 
 0–1 
Standings: Italy 19 points (7 matches), Slovenia 11 (8), Serbia 11 (7), Estonia 10 (8), Northern Ireland 9 (7), Faroe Islands 4 (9).
Group D:
 0–2 
 0–2 
 1–2 
Standings: France 16 points (7 matches), Bosnia and Herzegovina 13 (7), Belarus 12 (8), Romania 11 (7), Albania 8 (7), Luxembourg 1 (8).
Group E:
 4–1 
 2–1 
 11–0 
Standings: Netherlands 21 points (7 matches), Sweden 15 (7), Hungary 15 (8), Finland 9 (7), Moldova 6 (7), San Marino 0 (8).
Group F:
 0–1 
 1–3 
 0–1 
Standings: Greece 17 points (7 matches), Croatia 16 (7), Israel 13 (8), Georgia 9 (8), Latvia 7 (7), Malta 0 (7).
Group G:
 0–3 
 2–1 
Standings: England 14 points (6 matches), Montenegro 11 (6),  5 (5), Bulgaria 5 (6), Wales 3 (5).
Group H:
 1–0 
 0–4 
Standings: Portugal, Norway 13 points (6 matches),  10 (5), Cyprus 2 (5), Iceland 1 (6).
Group I:  0–0 
Standings:  15 points (5 matches),  9 (5), Lithuania 5 (6),  4 (4), Liechtenstein 4 (6).
2012 Africa Cup of Nations qualification, matchday 5:
Group I:  2–0 
Standings: Ghana 13 points (5 matches),  10 (4),  3 (4), Swaziland 0 (5).
2014 FIFA World Cup qualification – AFC Third Round, matchday 1:
Group A:
 2–1 
 0–2 
Group B:
 6–0 
 2–3 
Group C:
 1–0 
 0–1 
Group D:
 2–1 
 0–0 
Group E:
 3–0 
 0–0 
2014 FIFA World Cup qualification – CONCACAF Second Round, matchday 1:
Group A:
 1–0 
 3–2 
Group B:
 1–0 
 2–0 
Group C:  0–2 
Group D:
 4–1 
 0–0 
Group E:
 0–2 
 4–0 
Group F:
 6–0 
 5–2 
Friendly internationals (top 10 in FIFA World Rankings):
(2)  3–2  in St. Gallen, Switzerland
 2–3 (5) 
(9)  1–0  in Kolkata, India
FIFA Beach Soccer World Cup in Ravenna, Italy:
Group C:
 4–8 
 5–2 
Group D:
 2–3 
 3–3 (2–1 pen.)

Rowing
World Championships in Lake Bled, Slovenia:
Men:
Coxed pairs (M2+):   (Vincenzo Capelli, Pierpaolo Frattini, Niccolo Fanchi) 6:56.45   (William Lockwood, James Chapman, David Webster) 6:58.20   (Kevin Light, Steve Van Knotsenburg, Brian Price) 7:00.76
Lightweight single sculls (LM1x):  Henrik Stephansen  6:54.73  Pietro Ruta   7:01.54  Duncan Grant  7:03.30
Double sculls (M2x):   (Nathan Cohen, Joseph Sullivan) 6:10.76   (Hans Gruhne, Stephan Krüger) 6:10.82   (Cédric Berrest, Julien Bahain) 6:14.31
Cohen and Sullivan win the event for the second successive time.
Lightweight coxless fours (LM4-):   (Anthony Edwards, Samuel Beltz, Ben Cureton, Todd Skipworth) 5:55.10   (Daniele Danesin, Andrea Caianiello, Marcello Miani, Martino Goretti) 5:56.33   (Richard Chambers, Chris Bartley, Paul Mattick, Rob Williams) 5:57.33
Women:
Lightweight single sculls (LW1x):  Fabiana Beltrame  7:44.58  Pamela Weisshaupt  7:48.24  Lena Müller  7:50.44
Eights (W8+):   (Esther Lofgren, Susan Francia, Meghan Musnicki, Taylor Ritzel, Jamie Redman, Amanda Polk, Caroline Lind, Elle Logan, Mary Whipple) 6:03.65   (Janine Hanson, Rachelle Viinberg, Natalie Mastracci, Cristy Nurse, Krista Guloien, Ashley Brzozowicz, Darcy Marquardt, Andréanne Morin, Lesley Thompson) 6:04.39   (Alison Knowles, Jo Cook, Jessica Eddie, Louisa Reeve, Natasha Page, Lindsey Maguire, Katie Solesbury, Victoria Thornley, Caroline O'Connor) 6:06.03
The United States win the event for the fifth successive time.
Adaptive:
Men's single sculls (ASM1x):  Tom Aggar  4:58.01  Alexey Chuvashev  5:00.09  Erik Horrie  5:04.75
Aggar wins the event for the fourth successive time.

Tennis
Grand Slams:
US Open in New York City, United States, day 5:
Men's Singles, second round:
Rafael Nadal  [2] def. Nicolas Mahut  6–2, 6–2 retired
Andy Murray  [4] def. Robin Haase  6–7(5), 2–6, 6–2, 6–0, 6–4
David Ferrer  [5] def. James Blake  6–4, 6–3, 6–4
Women's Singles, third round:
Vera Zvonareva  [2] def. Anabel Medina Garrigues  [30] 6–4, 7–5
Flavia Pennetta  [26] def. Maria Sharapova  [3] 6–3, 3–6, 6–4
Samantha Stosur  [9] def. Nadia Petrova  [24] 7–6(5), 6–7(5), 7–5

Volleyball
Men's NORCECA Championship in Mayagüez, Puerto Rico:
Semifinals:
 2–3 
 3–0 
United States and Cuba both qualify for FIVB World Cup.

September 1, 2011 (Thursday)

Athletics
World Championships in Daegu, South Korea:
Men's high jump:  Jesse Williams  2.35m  Aleksey Dmitrik  2.35m  Trevor Barry  2.32m
Women's triple jump:  Olha Saladukha  14.94m  Olga Rypakova  14.89m  Caterine Ibargüen  14.84m
Men's 3000 metres steeplechase:  Ezekiel Kemboi  8:14.85  Brimin Kipruto  8:16.05  Mahiedine Mekhissi-Benabbad  8:16.09
Kemboi wins the event for the second successive time.
Women's 1500 metres:  Jennifer Simpson  4:05.40  Hannah England  4:05.68  Natalia Rodríguez  4:05.87
Women's 400 metres hurdles:  Lashinda Demus  52.47  Melaine Walker  52.73  Natalya Antyukh  53.85
Demus wins her second world championship title.
Men's 400 metres hurdles:  Dai Greene  48.26  Javier Culson  48.44  L. J. van Zyl  48.80

Basketball
EuroBasket in Lithuania:
Group A in Panevėžys:
 73–87 
 61–90 
 77–97 
Standings (after 2 games): Turkey, Lithuania, Spain 4 points, Poland, Portugal, Great Britain 2.
Group B in Šiauliai:
 77–92 
 68–85 
 62–76 
Standings (after 2 games): Germany, France, Serbia 4 points, Italy, Latvia, Israel 2.
Group C in Alytus:
 94–86 
 61–81 
 78–76 
Standings (after 2 games): Greece 4 points, Croatia, Bosnia and Herzegovina, Montenegro, Macedonia 3, Finland 2.
Group D in Klaipėda:
 68–65 
 58–65 
 64–68 
Standings (after 2 games): Russia, Slovenia 4 points, Georgia, Bulgaria 3, Ukraine, Belgium 2.
FIBA Americas Championship in Mar del Plata, Argentina (teams in bold advance to the quarterfinals):
Group A:
 69–106 
 72–73 
Standings: Dominican Republic 5 points (3 games),  4 (2), Venezuela 4 (3), Canada 3 (2), Cuba 2 (2).
Group B:
 86–89 
 64–74 
Standings: Puerto Rico 6 points (3 games),  4 (2), Panama 3 (2), Paraguay 3 (3), Uruguay 2 (2).

Cricket
Australia in Sri Lanka:
1st Test in Galle, day 2:  273 & 115/6 (33.5 overs);  105 (50 overs; Nathan Lyon 5/34). Australia lead by 283 runs with 4 wickets remaining.
Pakistan in Zimbabwe:
Only Test in Bulawayo, day 1:  245/4 (90 overs); .

Cycling
Grand Tours:
Vuelta a España, Stage 12:  Peter Sagan  4h 03' 01"  John Degenkolb  s.t.  Daniele Bennati  s.t.
General classification (after stage 12): (1) Bradley Wiggins   46h 53' 47" (2) Chris Froome  + 7" (3) Fredrik Kessiakoff  + 9"

Football (soccer)
2012 Olympics Women's Asian Qualifiers Final Round in Jinan, China:
 3–0 
 1–0 
 0–0 
FIFA Beach Soccer World Cup in Ravenna, Italy:
Group A:
 8–8 (0–1 pen.) 
 6–6 (5–4 pen.) 
Group B:
 3–1 
 2–11 
Copa Sudamericana Second stage, first leg:
Argentinos Juniors  0–0  Vélez Sarsfield
Deportivo Anzoátegui  1–2  Universitario

Rowing
World Championships in Lake Bled, Slovenia:
Men:
Lightweight coxless pairs (LM2-):   (Peter Chambers, Kieren Emery) 6:27.30   (Luca De Maria, Armando Dell'Aquila) 6:28.59   (Bastian Seibt, Lars Wichert) 6:29.05
Eights (M8+):   (Gregor Hauffe, Andreas Kuffner, Eric Johannesen, Maximilian Reinelt, Richard Schmidt, Lukas Müller, Florian Mennigen, Kristof Wilke, Martin Sauer) 5:28.81   (Nathaniel Reilly-O'Donnell, Cameron Nichol, James Foad, Alex Partridge, Moe Sbihi, Greg Searle, Tom Ransley, Daniel Ritchie, Phelan Hill) 5:30.83   (Gabriel Bergen, Andrew Byrnes, Jeremianh Brown, Douglas Csima, Malcolm Howard, Conlin McCabe, Robert Gibson, Will Crothers, Brian Price) 5:31.18
Germany win the event for the third successive time.
Women:
Coxless pairs (W2-):   (Juliette Haigh, Rebecca Scown) 6:58.16   (Helen Glover, Heather Stanning) 6:58.24   (Sarah Tait, Kate Hornsey) 7:03.98
Haigh and Scown win the event for the second successive time.
Quadruple sculls (W4x):   (Julia Richter, Tina Manker, Stephanie Schiller, Britta Oppelt) 6:18.37   (Stesha Carle, Natalie Dell, Adrienne Martelli, Megan Kalmoe) 6:19.90   (Sarah Gray, Louise Trappitt, Fiona Bourke, Eve MacFarlane) 6:23.33
Adaptive:
Mixed coxed fours (IDMix4+):   3:51.08   4:01.12   4:01.41
Women's single sculls (ASW1x):  Alla Lysenko  5:39.52  Nathalie Benoit  5:41.39  Moran Samuel  5:49.97

Tennis
Grand Slams:
US Open in New York City, United States, day 4:
Men's Singles, second round:
Novak Djokovic  [1] def. Carlos Berlocq  6–0, 6–0, 6–2
Roger Federer  [3] def. Dudi Sela  6–3, 6–2, 6–2
Juan Carlos Ferrero  def. Gaël Monfils  [7] 7–6(5), 5–7, 6–7(5), 6–4, 6–4
Mardy Fish  [8] def. Malek Jaziri  6–2, 6–2, 6–4
Tomáš Berdych  [9] def. Fabio Fognini  7–5, 6–0, 6–0
Women's Singles, second round:
Caroline Wozniacki  [1] def. Arantxa Rus  6–2, 6–0
Victoria Azarenka  [4] def. Gisela Dulko  6–4, 6–3
Francesca Schiavone  [7] def. Mirjana Lučić  6–1, 6–1
Andrea Petkovic  [10] def. Zheng Jie  3–6, 6–3, 6–3

Volleyball
Men's NORCECA Championship in Mayagüez, Puerto Rico:
Quarterfinals:
 3–0 
 3–0

References

9